= Cover art =

Artwork on the outside of a published product

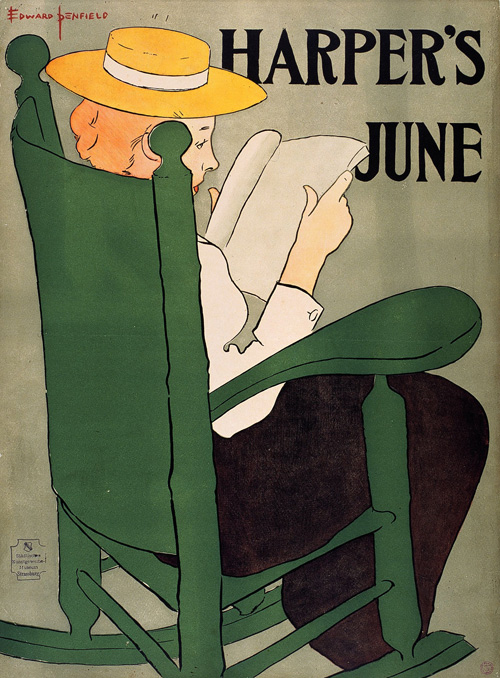
Harper's Magazine, June 1896, by Edward Penfield

Cover art is a type of artwork presented as an illustration or photograph on the outside of a published product, such as a book (often on a dust jacket), magazine, newspaper (tabloid), comic book, video game (box art), music album (album art), CD, videotape, DVD, or podcast. Cover art can include various things such as logos, symbols, images, colors, or anything that represents what is being sold or advertised. The art has a commercial function (i.e., to promote the product it is displayed on), but can also have an aesthetic function, and may be artistically connected to the product (such as with art by, or commissioned by, the creator of the product).

== Album cover art ==
Album cover art has a long history dating back to the late 19th century. This art is artwork created for a music album and is one of the most representative techniques to show the changes and trends found within the music, art, culture, and technological industries. As music became popularized, so did creating cover art. Throughout the years, cover art went through different stages and styles.

In 1938, Columbia Records hired Alex Steinweiss as its first art director. Albums can have cover art created by the musician, as with Joni Mitchell's Clouds, or by an associated musician, such as Bob Dylan's artwork for the cover of Music from Big Pink, by the Band, Dylan's backup band's first album.

Artists known for their album cover art include Alex Steinweiss, an early pioneer in album cover art, Roger Dean, and the Hipgnosis studio. Some album art may cause controversy because of nudity (for example, John Lennon and Yoko Ono's Unfinished Music No. 1: Two Virgins), offending churches, trademark or others. There have been numerous books documenting album cover art, particularly rock and jazz album covers. Steinweiss was an art director and graphic designer who brought custom artwork to record album covers and invented the first packaging for long-playing records.

Joanne Gair's early album artwork such as David Lee Roth's 1986 Eat 'Em and Smile album cover helped launch her career.

== Book cover ==
A book cover is usually made up of images (illustrations, photographs, or a combination of both) and text. It emerged in the 19th century when books started to become mass-produced. It usually includes the book title and author and can also include (but not always) a book tagline or quote. The book cover design is usually designed by a graphic designer or book designer, working in-house at a publisher or freelance. Authors can make suggestions for book cover design elements (e.g., a preferred color) but rarely communicate directly with the designer. Once the front cover art has been approved, they will then continue to design the layout of the spine (including the book title, author name and publisher imprint logo) and the back cover (usually including a book blurb and sometimes the barcode and publisher logo). Books can be designed as a set of series or as an individual design. Very commonly, the same book will be designed with a different cover in different countries to suit the specific audience. For example, a cover designed for Australia may have a completely different design in the United Kingdom and again in the United States.

Book covers need to be effective at marketing, which can encourage reliance on stereotypical representations. For example, if the marketing strategy emphasizes that the author is a woman, then the cover might be designed in stereotypical feminine colors such as pink, and if the publisher wants to emphasize that the author is from a particular ethnic background, then the cover might include stereotypical representations of people from that ethnic group.

Book cover art has had books written on the subject. Numerous artists have become noted for their book cover art, including Richard M. Powers and Chip Kidd. In one of the most recognizable book covers in American literature, two sad female eyes (and bright red lips) adrift in the deep blue of a night sky, hover ominously above a skyline that glows like a carnival. Evocative of sorrow and excess, the haunting image has become so inextricably linked to The Great Gatsby that it still adorns the cover of F. Scott Fitzgerald's book 88 years after its debut. The iconic cover art was created by Spanish artist Francis Cugat. With the release of a big Hollywood movie, however, some printings of the book have abandoned the classic cover in favor of one that ties in more closely with the film.

== Magazine cover ==
First showing in the 1900s, illustrated covers became common with magazines like Vogue and Cosmopolitan featuring full-page illustrations. The first magazine cover with a photo appeared in 1932. Vogue was one of the first to adopt photography, and its first full-color photo cover was in July 1932. Artists such as Salvador Dalí, Man Ray, and Juan Miró contributed covers to Vogue in the 1940s. Magazine cover artists include Art Spiegelman, who modernized the look of The New Yorker magazine, and his predecessor Rea Irvin, who created the Eustace Tilly character for the magazine. Magazine cover artists who were well known for capturing important political and social issues of the day include Norman Rockwell, whose work appeared 322 times on the cover of The Saturday Evening Post (11 featuring the Willie Gillis character), and Dennis Wheeler, whose 40 covers for Time magazine illustrated social movements and news events of the 1960s and 1970s; seven of them are in the permanent collection of the Museum of Modern Art in New York City. Mad magazine has a long history of placing the Alfred E. Neuman character prominently on its cover. Magazine cover art has also been used by the Works Progress Administration to promote knowledge in cities such as New York, Washington DC, and the state of Illinois.

== Tabloid cover ==
Today, the word tabloid is used as a derogatory descriptor of a style of journalism, rather than its original intent as an indicator of half-broadsheet size. This tends to cloud the fact that the great tabloids were skilfully produced amalgams of human interest stories told with punchy brevity, a clarity drawn from the choice of simple but effective words and often with a dose of wit. The gossipy tabloid scandal sheets, as we know them today, have been around since 1830. That's when Benjamin Day and James Gordon Bennett Sr., the respective publishers of The Sun and the New York Herald, launched what became known as the penny press (whose papers sold for one cent apiece). But some of what is considered the world's best journalism has been tabloid. From the days when John Pilger revealed the truth of Cambodia's Killing Fields in the Daily Mirror, to the stream of revelations that showed the hypocrisy of John Major's "back to basics" cabinet, award-winning writing in the tabloids is acknowledged every year at the National Press Awards.

== Comic book cover ==
Comic book covers are most often defined by their use of characters, having the main character of the comic be front and center within the composition. The Logo of the franchise of that comic book is typically located towards the top of the cover.

Concerns over alleged violence and sexual illusions within comic books lead to Dr. Fredric Wertham produced Seduction of the Innocent which argued in favor of these concerns. Public sentiment towards comic books shifted negatively after Wertham’s book was published which culminated in a Senate Subcommittee hearing over the issue. With rising legal and public concerns many comic book publishers formed the Comics Code Authority which placed harsh restrictions on comic book writers and publishers to avoid sexually evocative or realistic crime scenes. The Comics Code Authority seal was included on all comic books sold in stores from the publishers behind the Comics Code Authority. The seal stayed a permanent fixture of comic book cover art until January, 2011.

== Sheet music cover ==
Sheet music cover artists include Frederick Stewart Manning, William Austin Starmer and Frederick Waite Starmer, all three of whom worked for Jerome H. Remick. Other prolific artists included Albert Wilfred Barbelle, André C. De Takacs, and Gene Buck. E. H. Pfeiffer did cover illustrations for Gotham-Attucks; Remick, F.B. Haviland Pub. Co.; Jerome & Schwartz Publishing Company; Lew Berk Music Company; Waterson, Berlin & Snyder, Inc.; and others.

== Gallery ==
=== Books ===
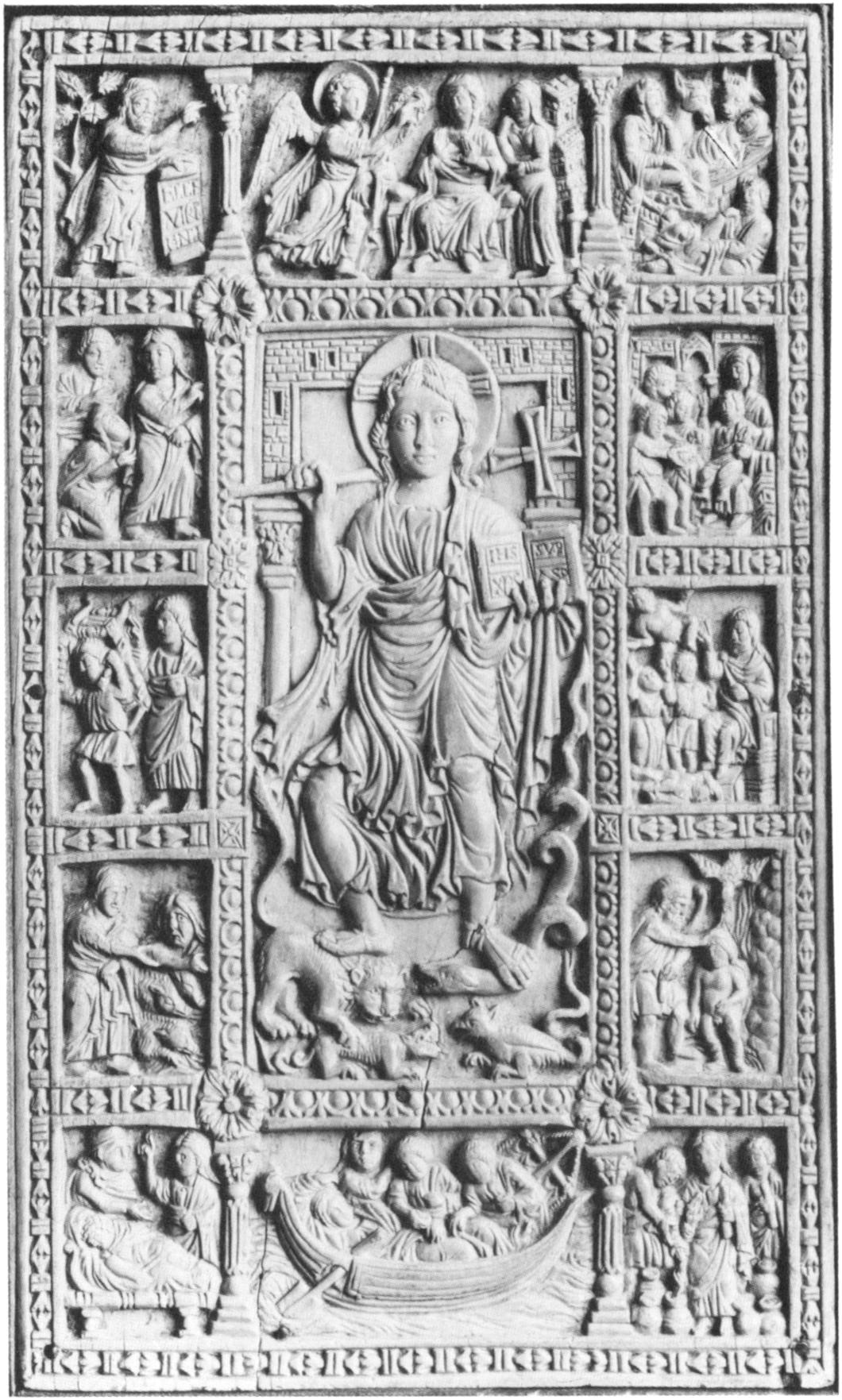
Ivory book cover with scenes from the life of Christ, c. 800 AD

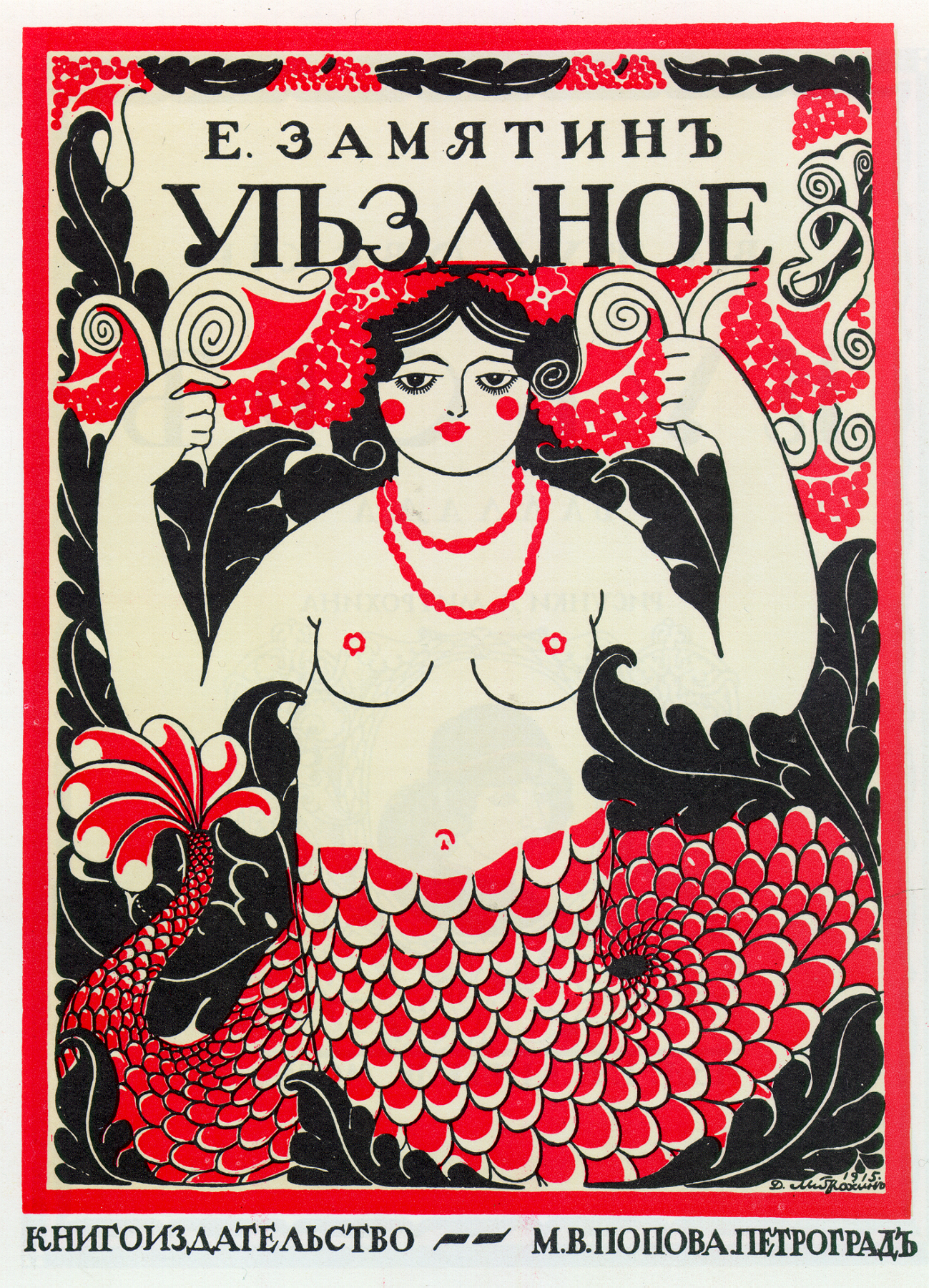
Uezdnoe, by Yevgeny Zamyatin, 1916

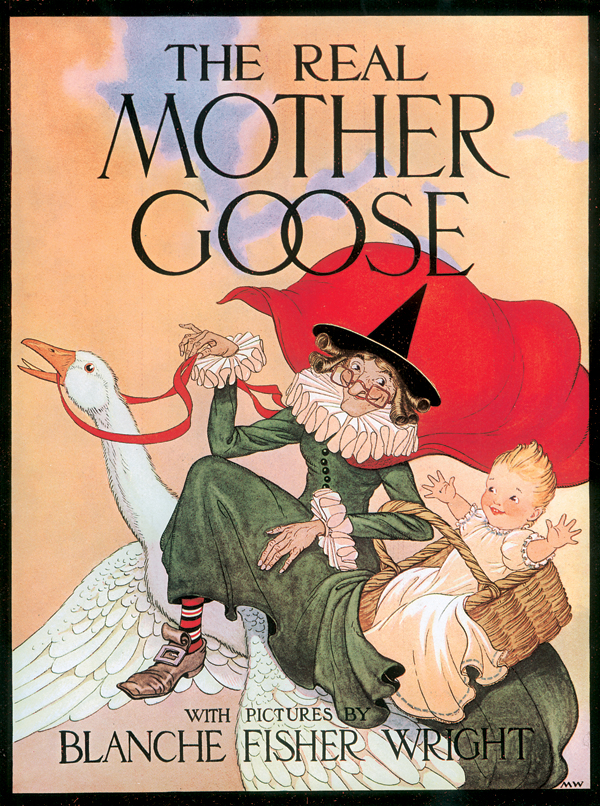
The Real Mother Goose, Blanche Fisher Wright, illustrator, 1916

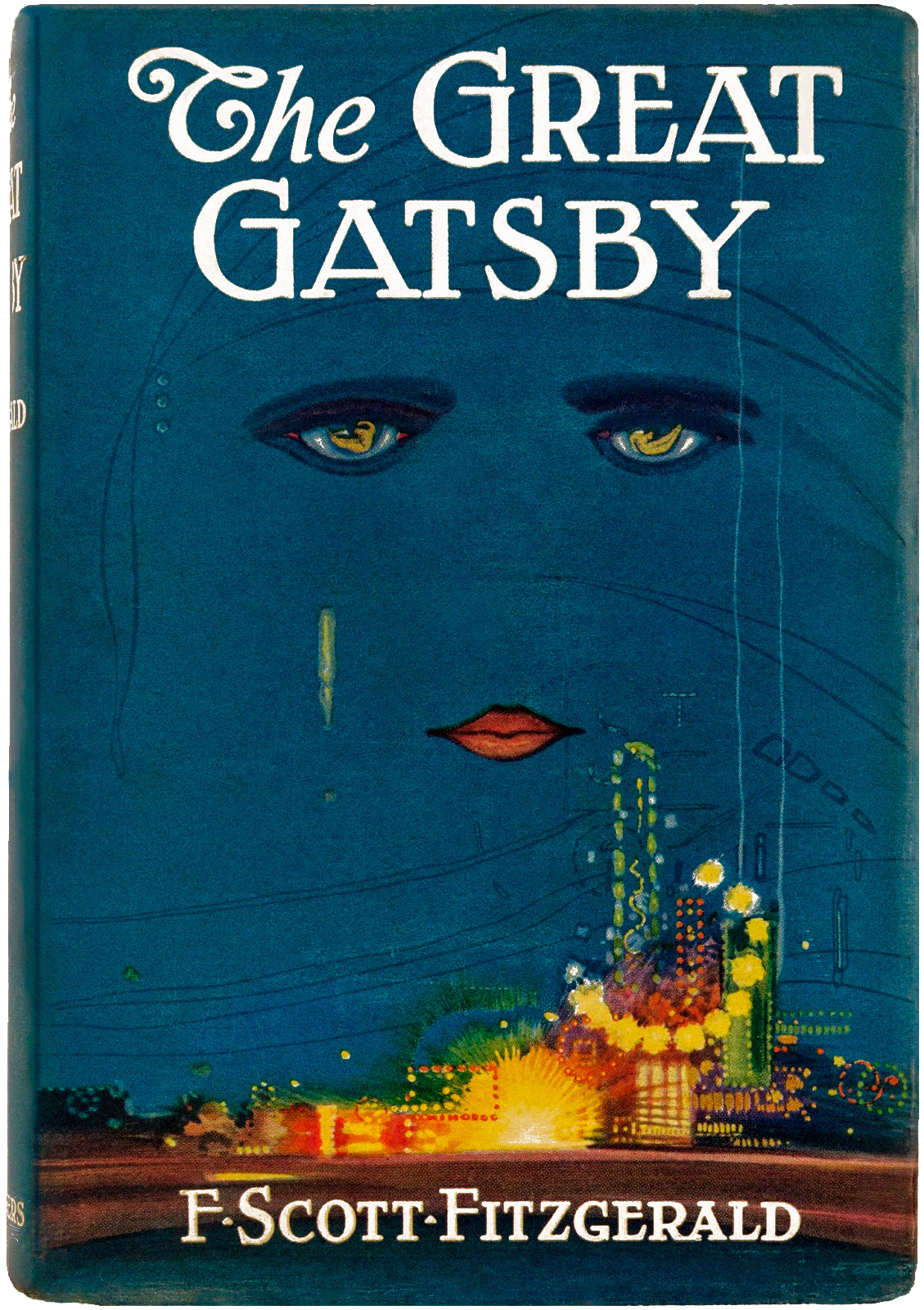
The Great Gatsby by F. Scott Fitzgerald, dust jacket art by Francis Cugat, 1925

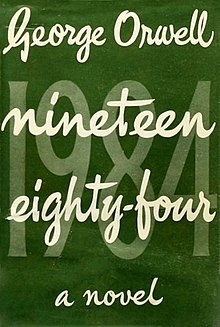
Nineteen Eighty-Four by George Orwell, 1949

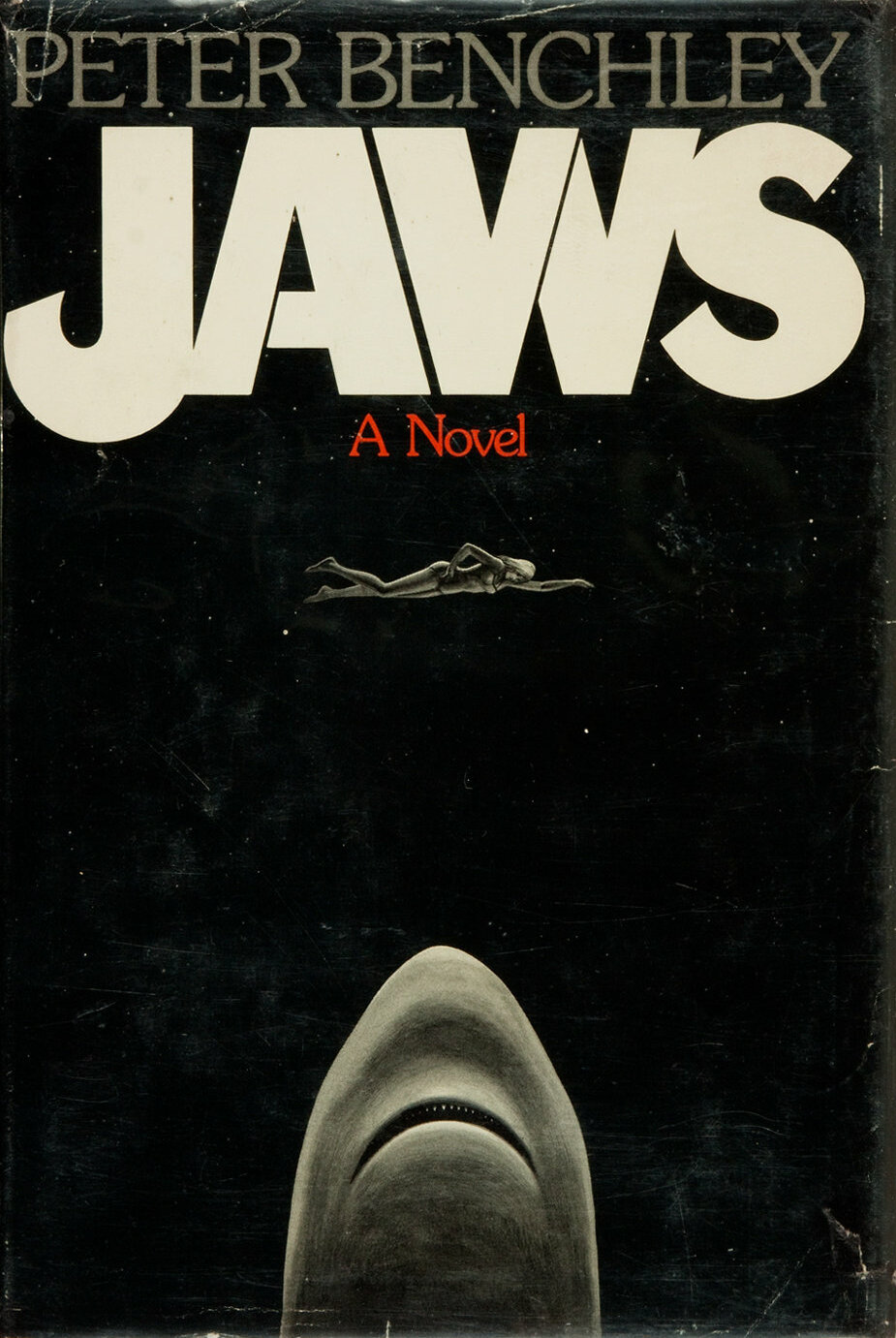
Jaws by Peter Benchley, (1974)

=== Newspapers, magazines, comic books ===
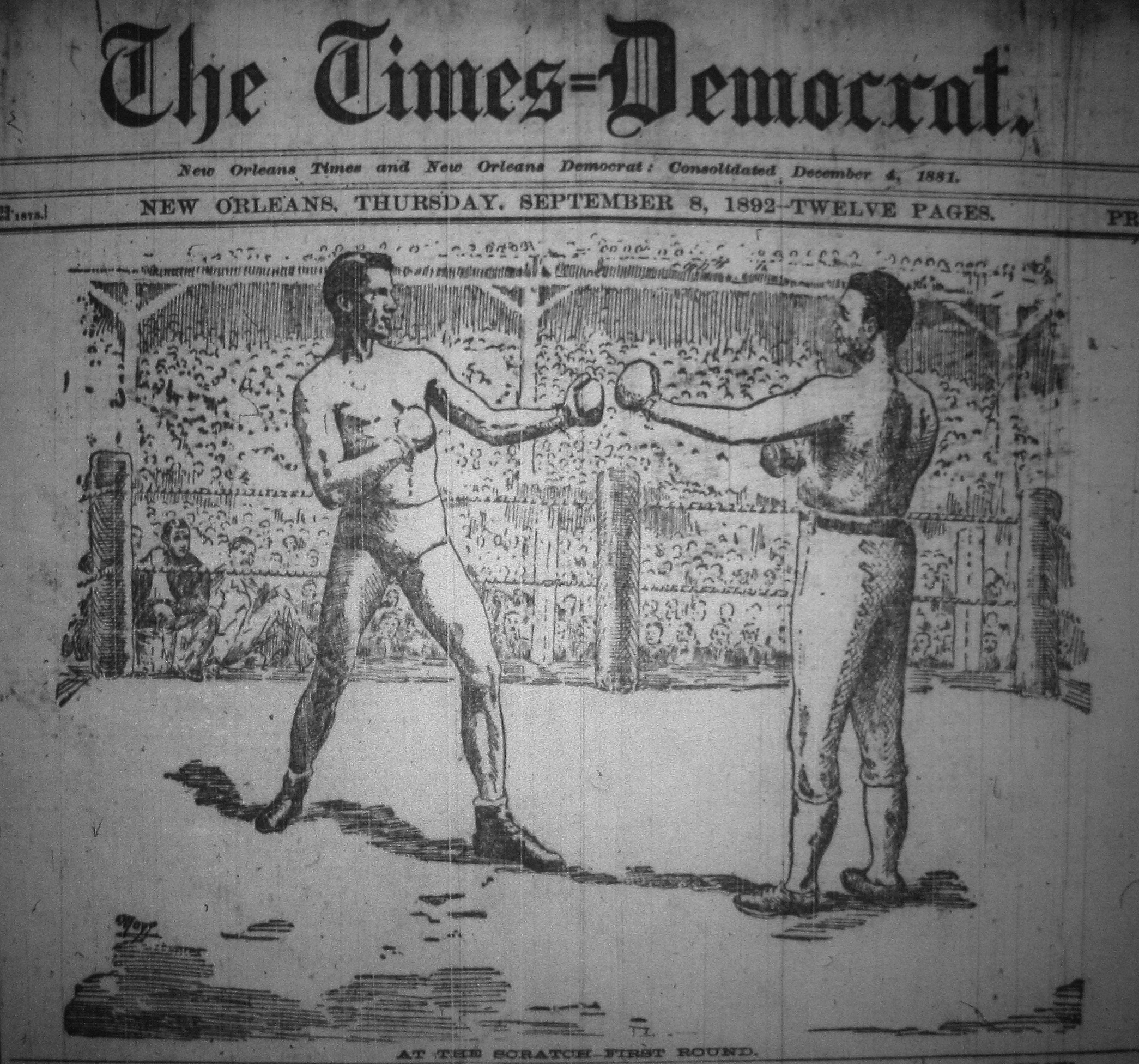
Gentleman Jim Corbett and John L. Sullivan at the Olympic Club, New Orleans, The Times-Democrat, September 8, 1892

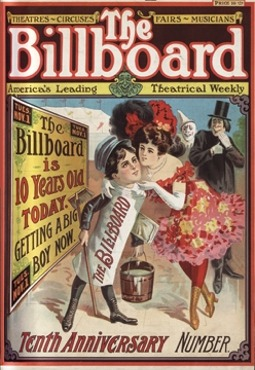
Billboard's tenth anniversary edition, 1904

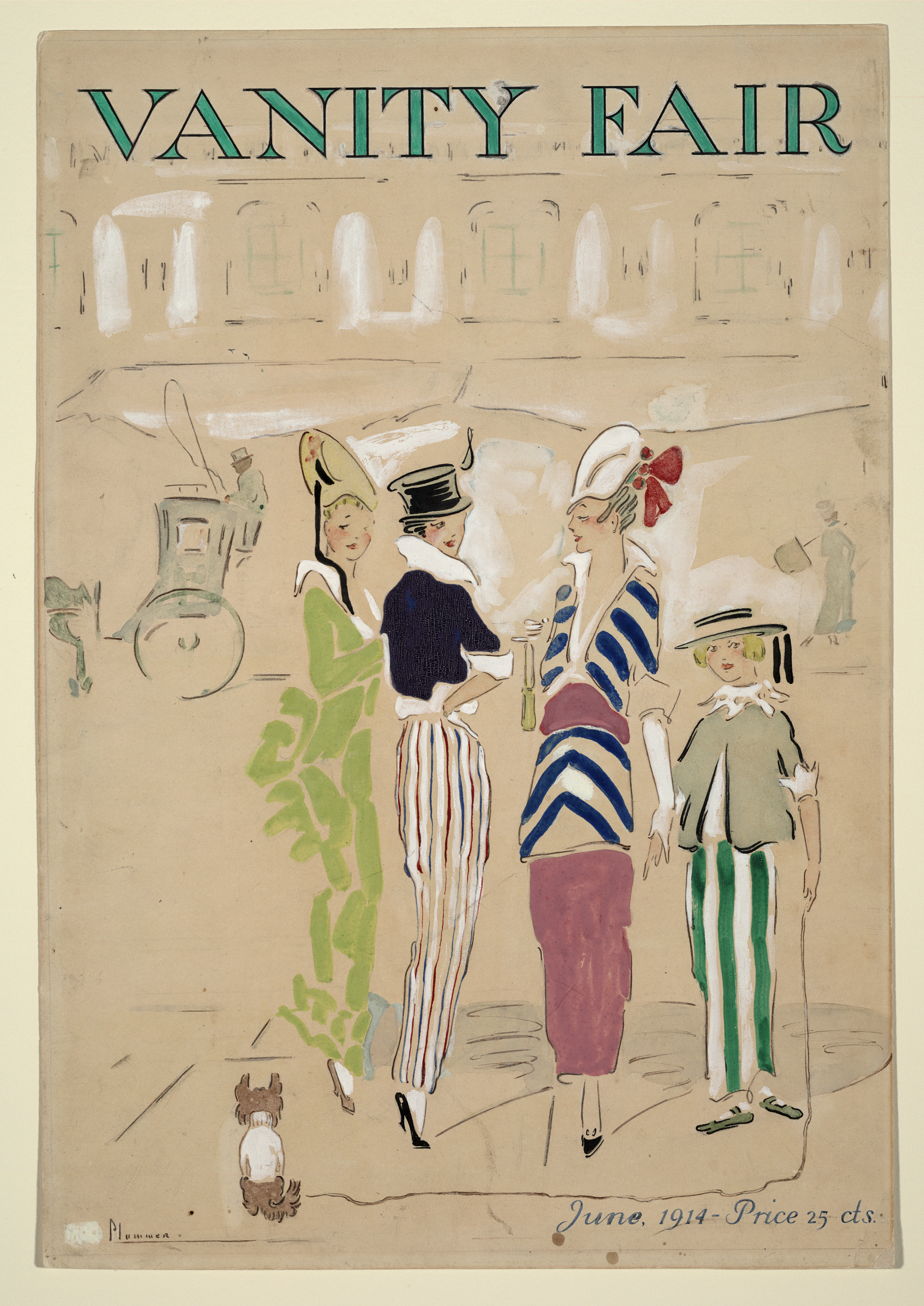
Vanity Fair, June 1914

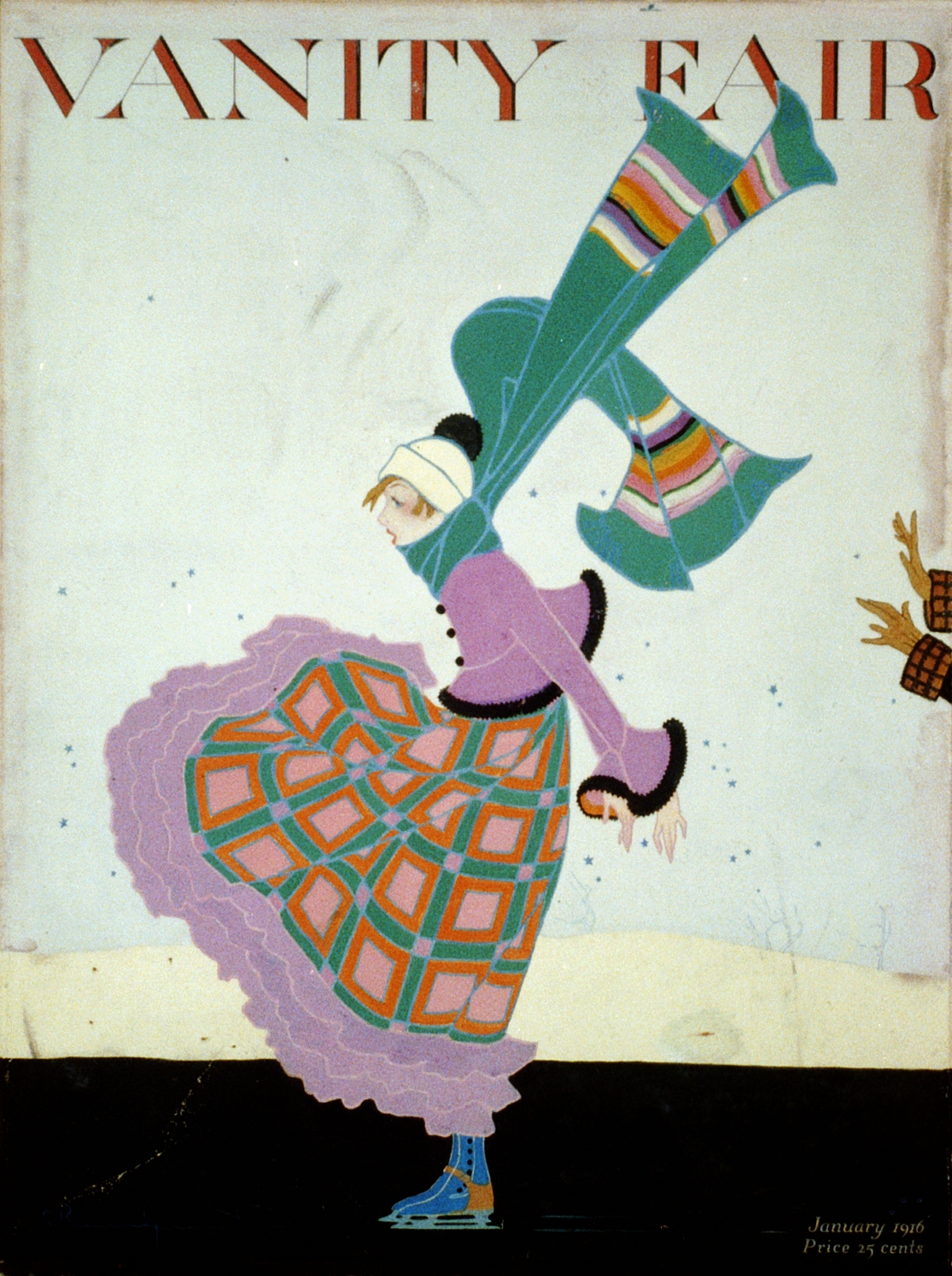
Skater with scarf, illustrated by Ethel Caroline Rundquist, Vanity Fair, January 1916

The Silver Sheet, a studio publication promoting Thomas Ince Productions Bell Boy 13, E. H. Pfeiffer, illustrator, January 1923

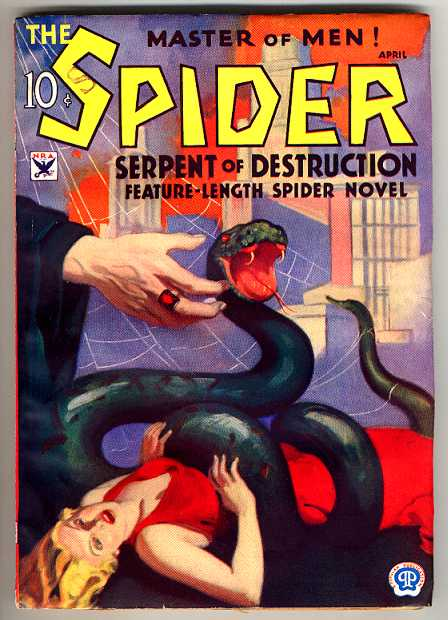
Pulp magazine Spider, vol. 2, no. 3, April 1934

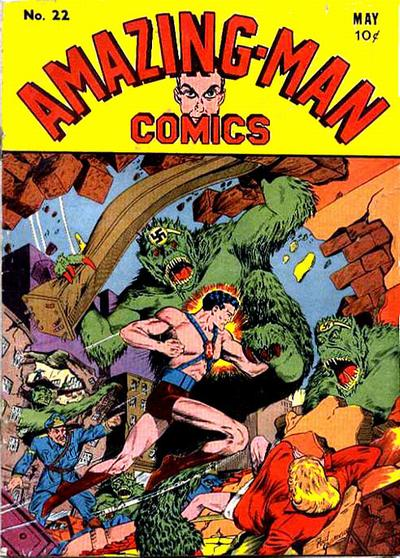
Amazing Man Comics no. 22, illustrated by Paul Gustavson, May 1941

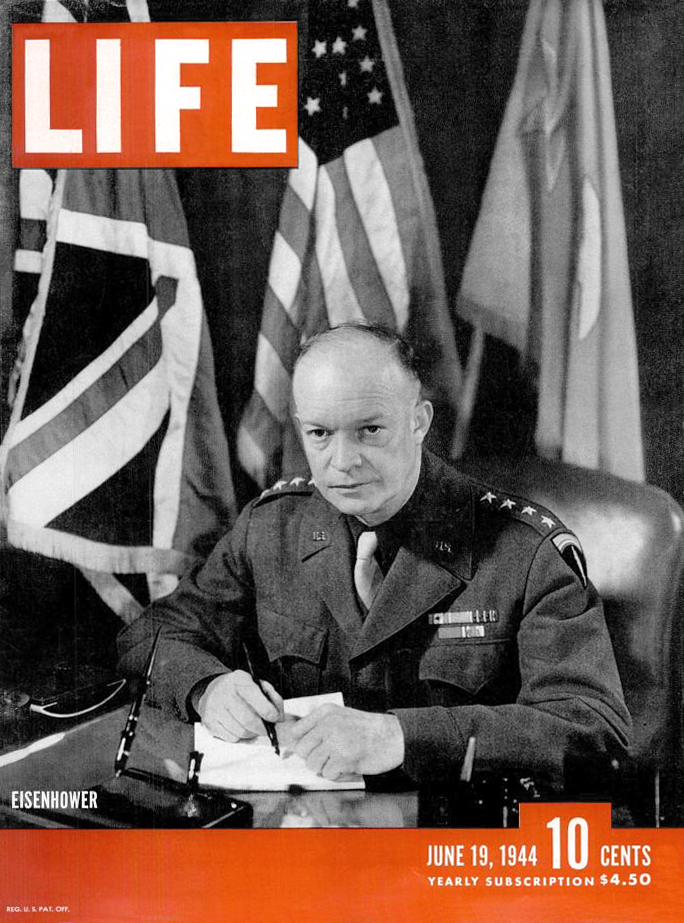
LIFE magazine, official U.S. Army photo, June 19, 1944

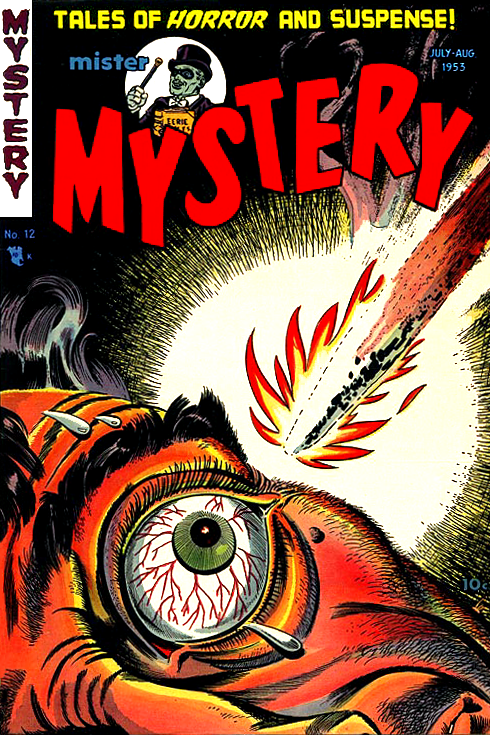
Mister Mystery #1, Key Publications, July–August 1953

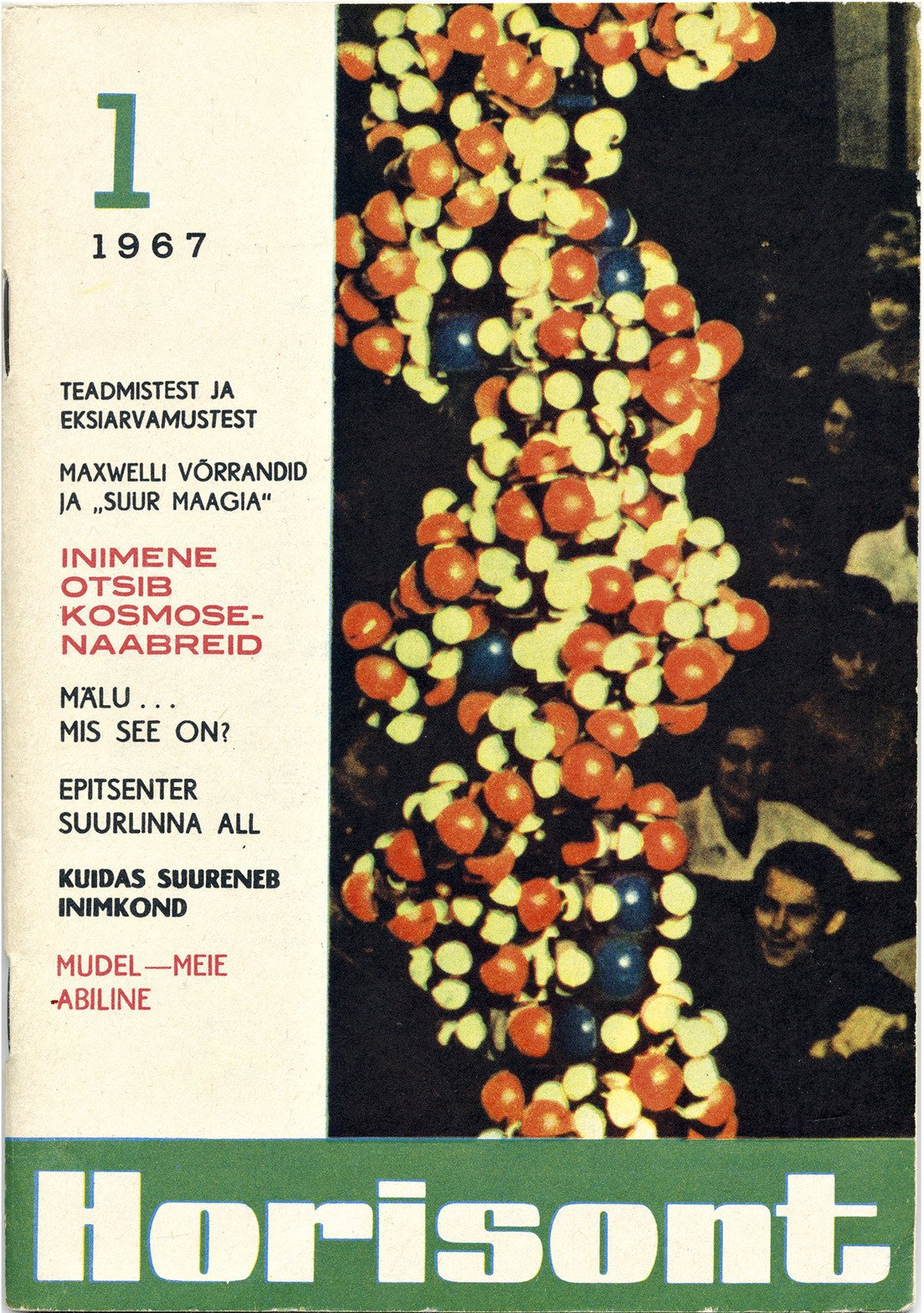
The first Horisont magazine in Estonia, 1967

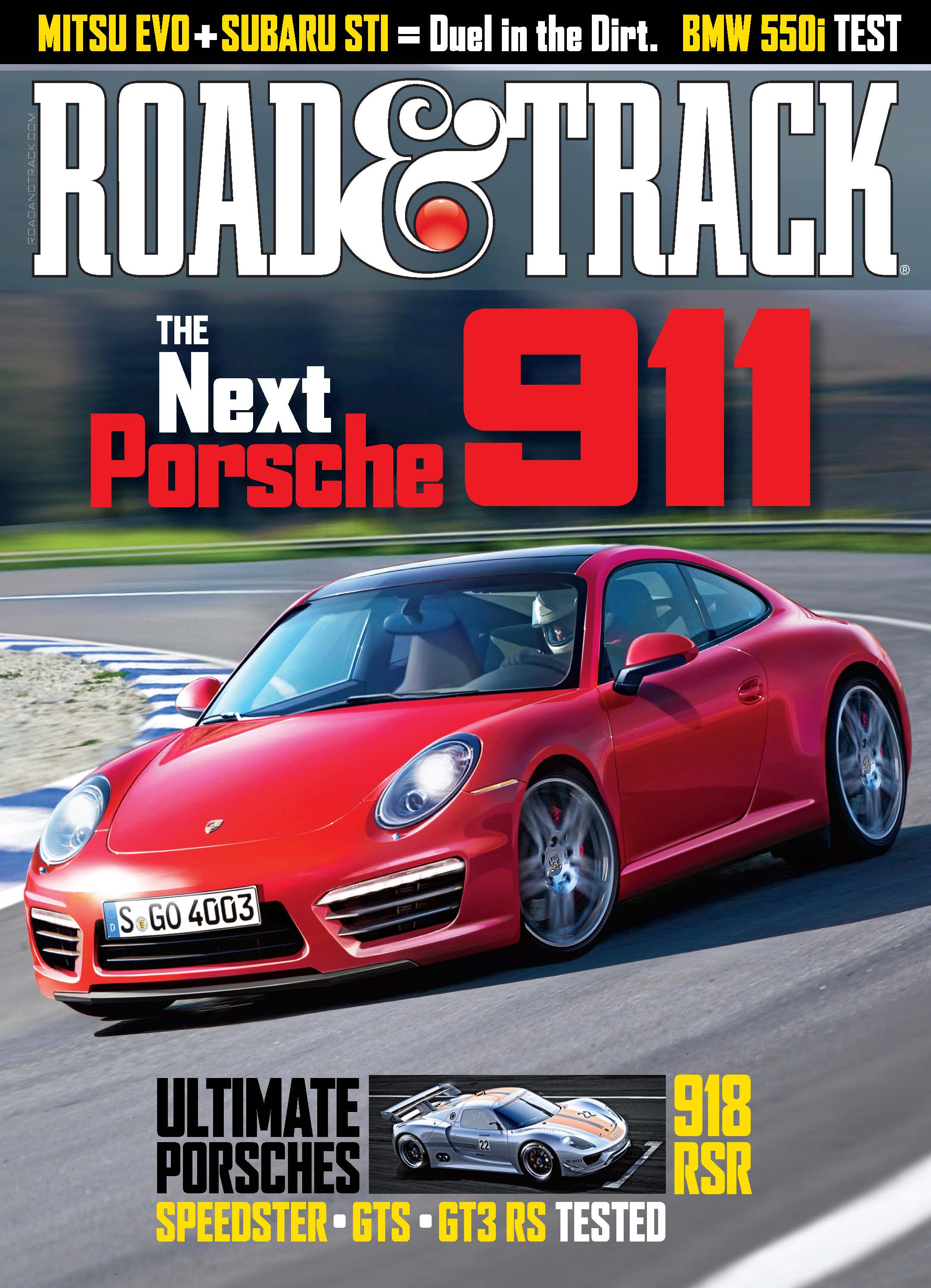
Road & Track automobile magazine featuring a Porsche 991, March 2011

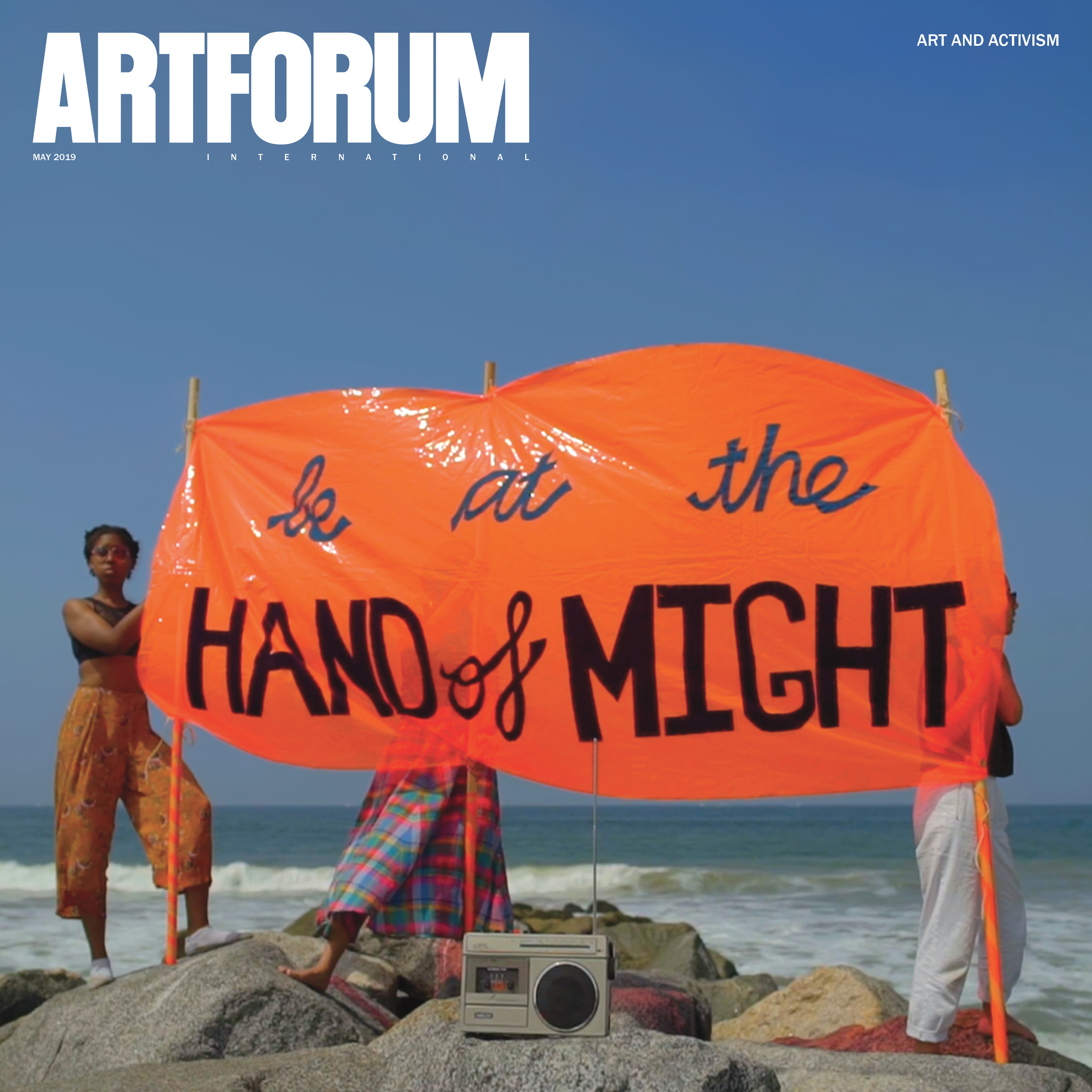
Artforum art magazine, featuring Cauleen Smith in a digital video Sojourner, May 2019

net computer magazine, June 2020

Broadcast trade magazine, November 2024

=== Sheet music, recorded music ===
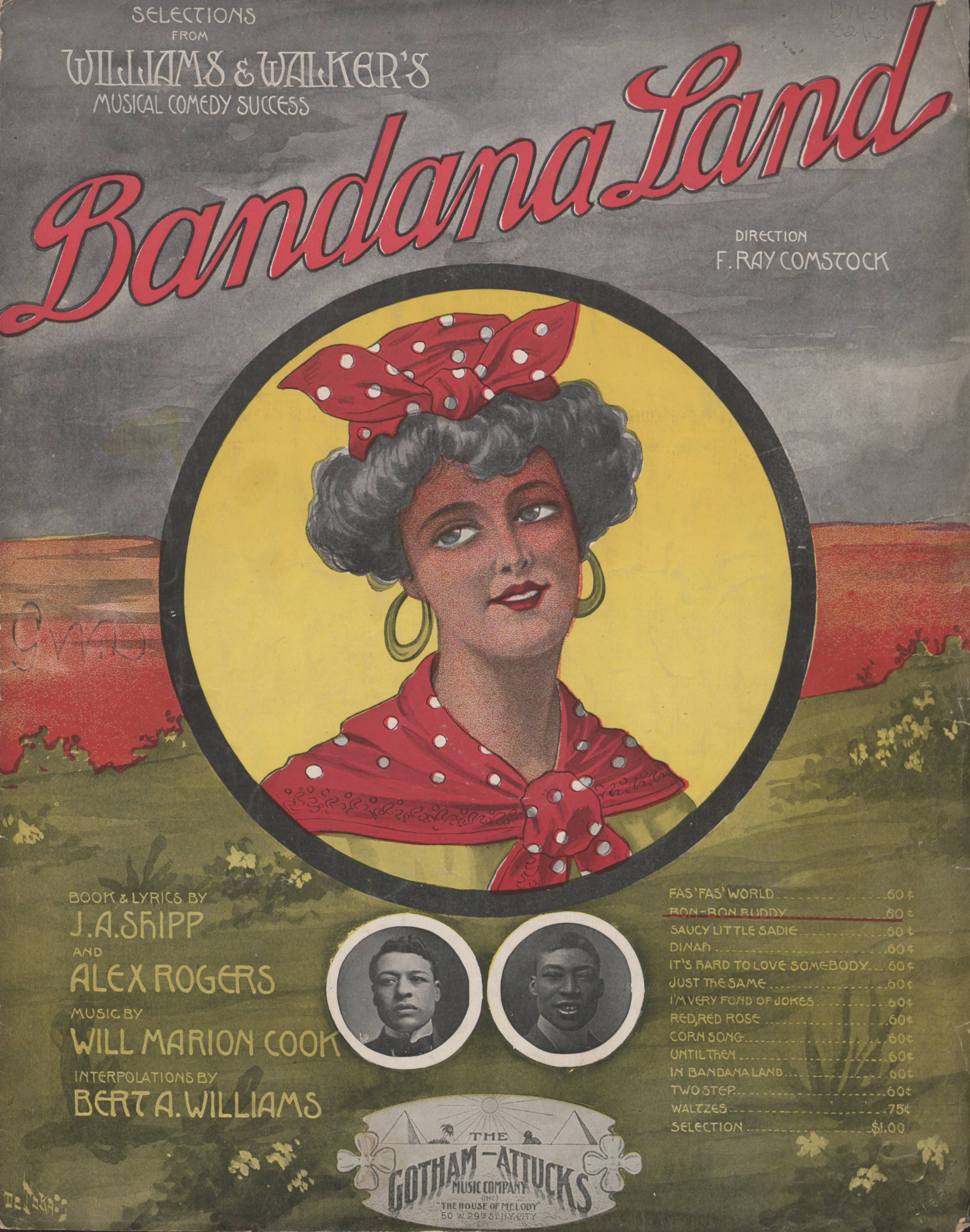
Sheet music for the Broadway musical, Bandanna Land, Andréa Stephen Chevalier de Takacs, illustrator, Gotham-Attucks, publisher, 1908

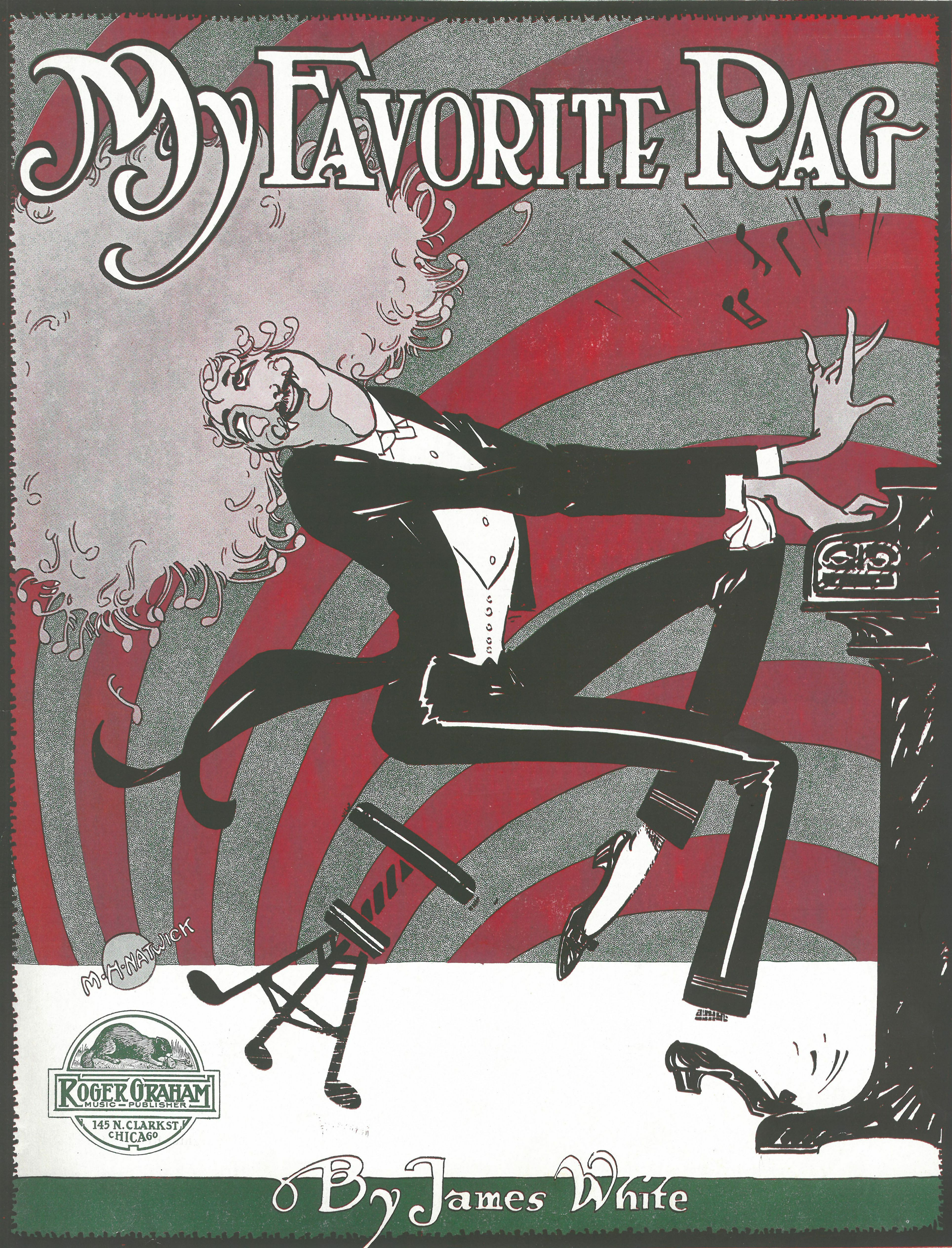
"My Favorite Rag" by James White, illustration by Grim Natwick (one of his earliest published works), 1915

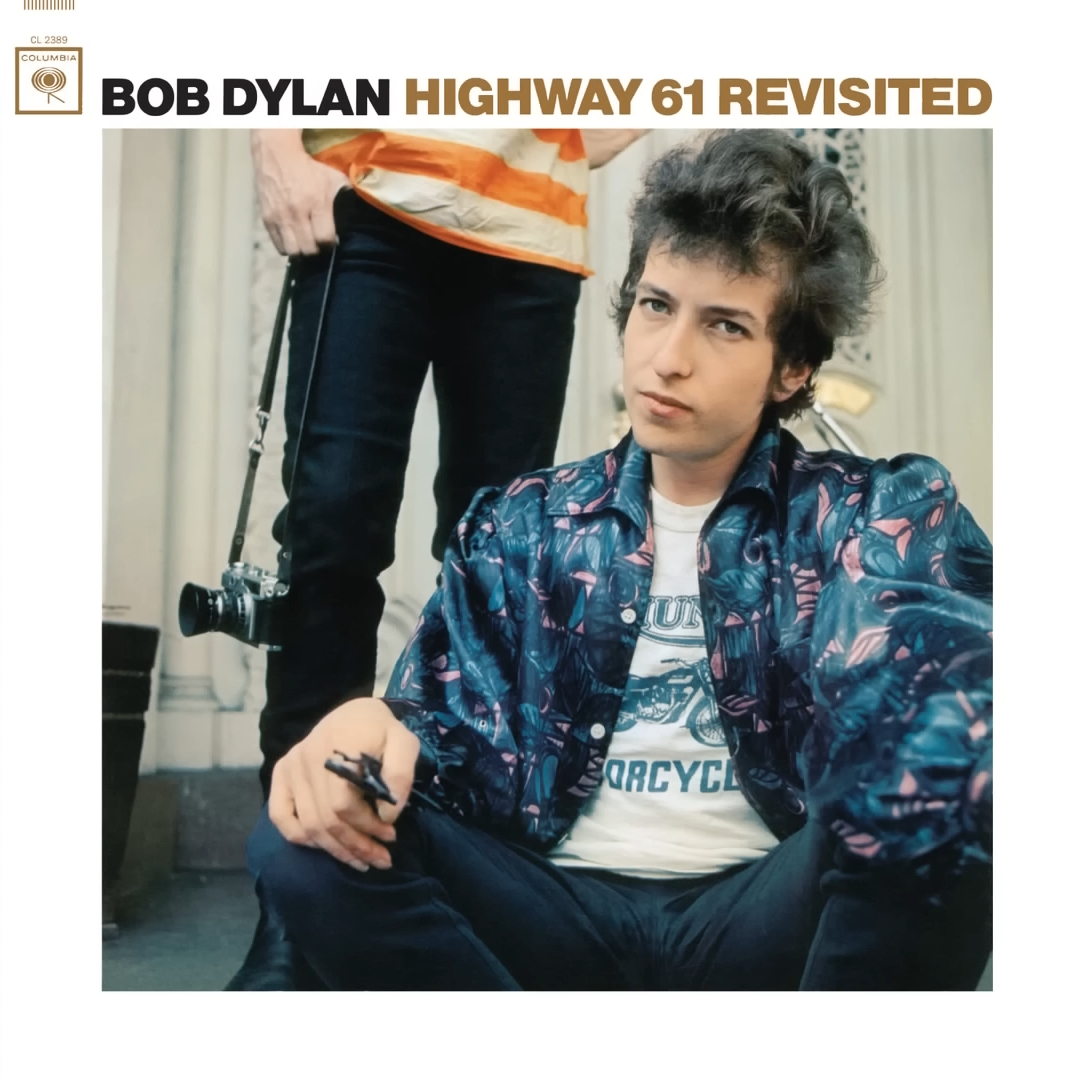
Cover for Bob Dylan's album Highway 61 Revisited, 1965

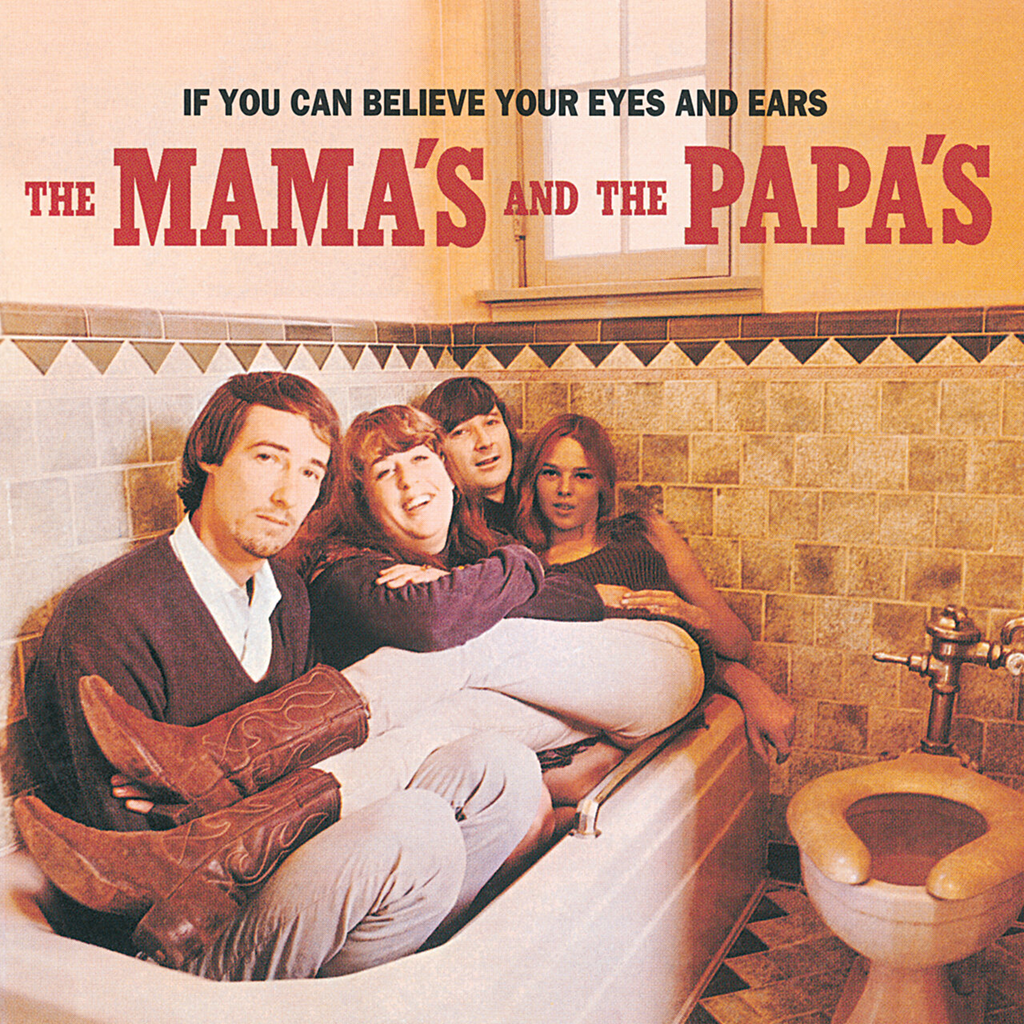
Cover for the Mamas & the Papas' album If You Can Believe Your Eyes and Ears, 1966

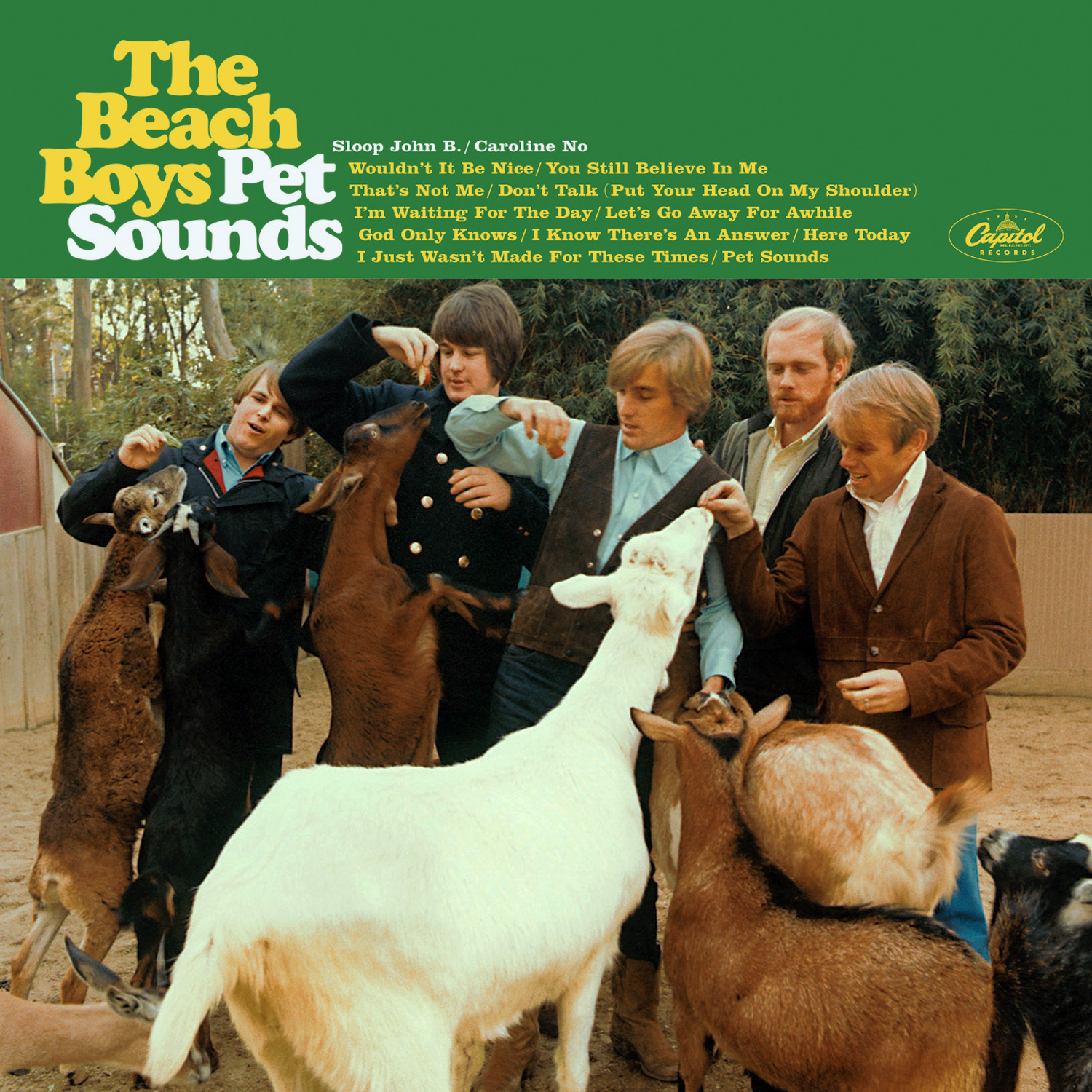
Cover for the Beach Boys' album Pet Sounds, 1966

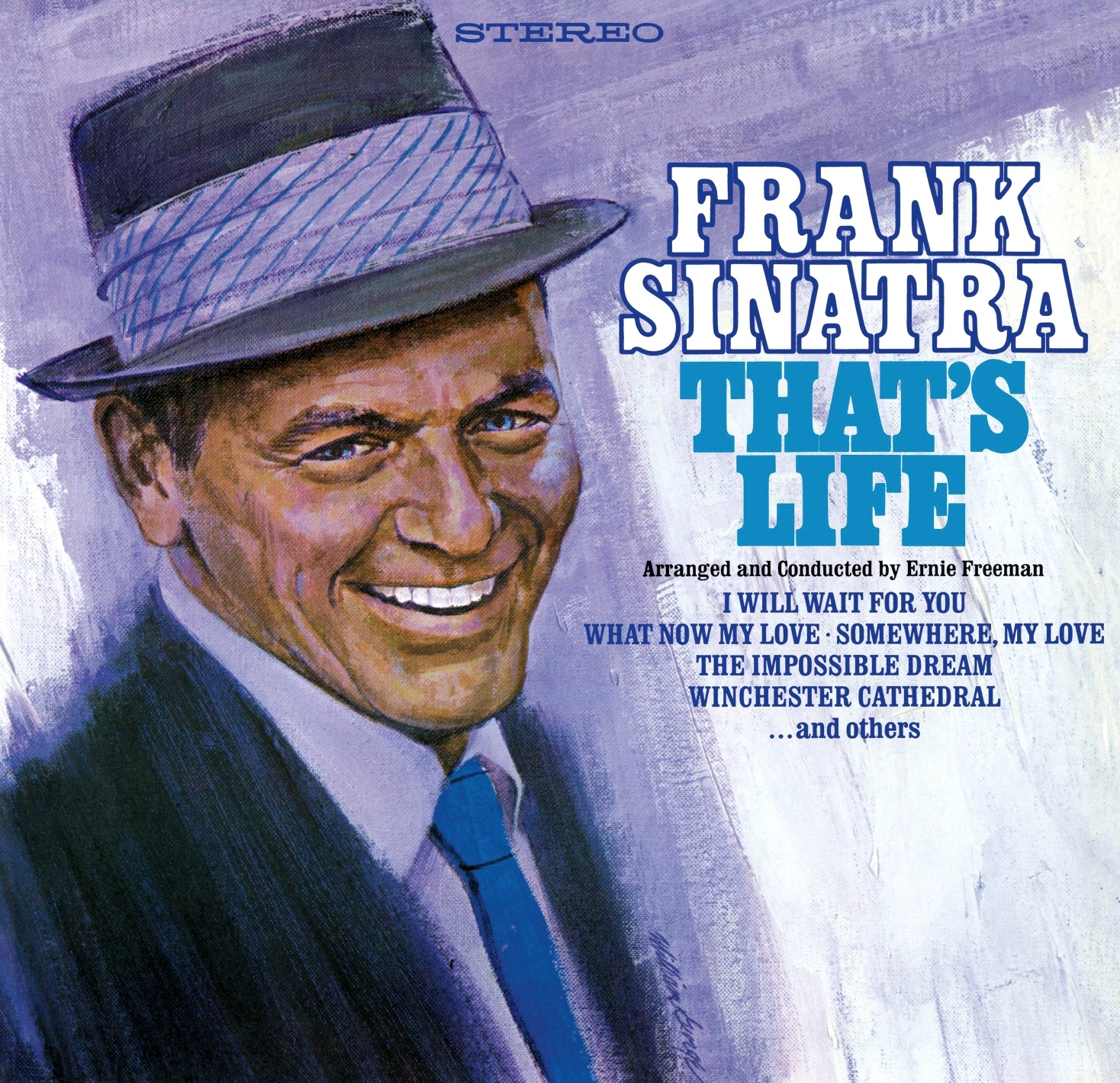
Cover for Frank Sinatra's album That's Life, 1966

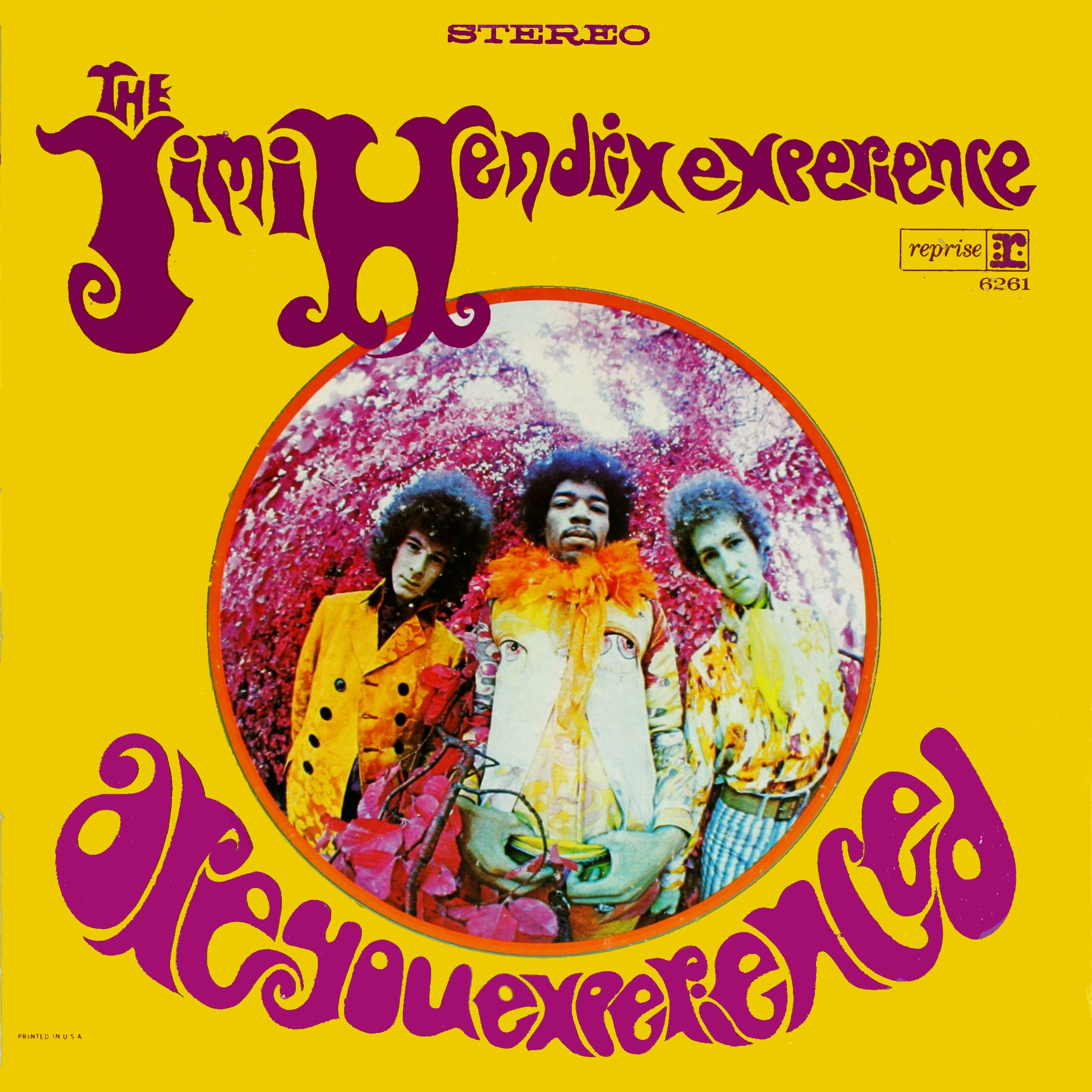
Cover for the Jimi Hendrix Experience's album Are You Experienced, 1967

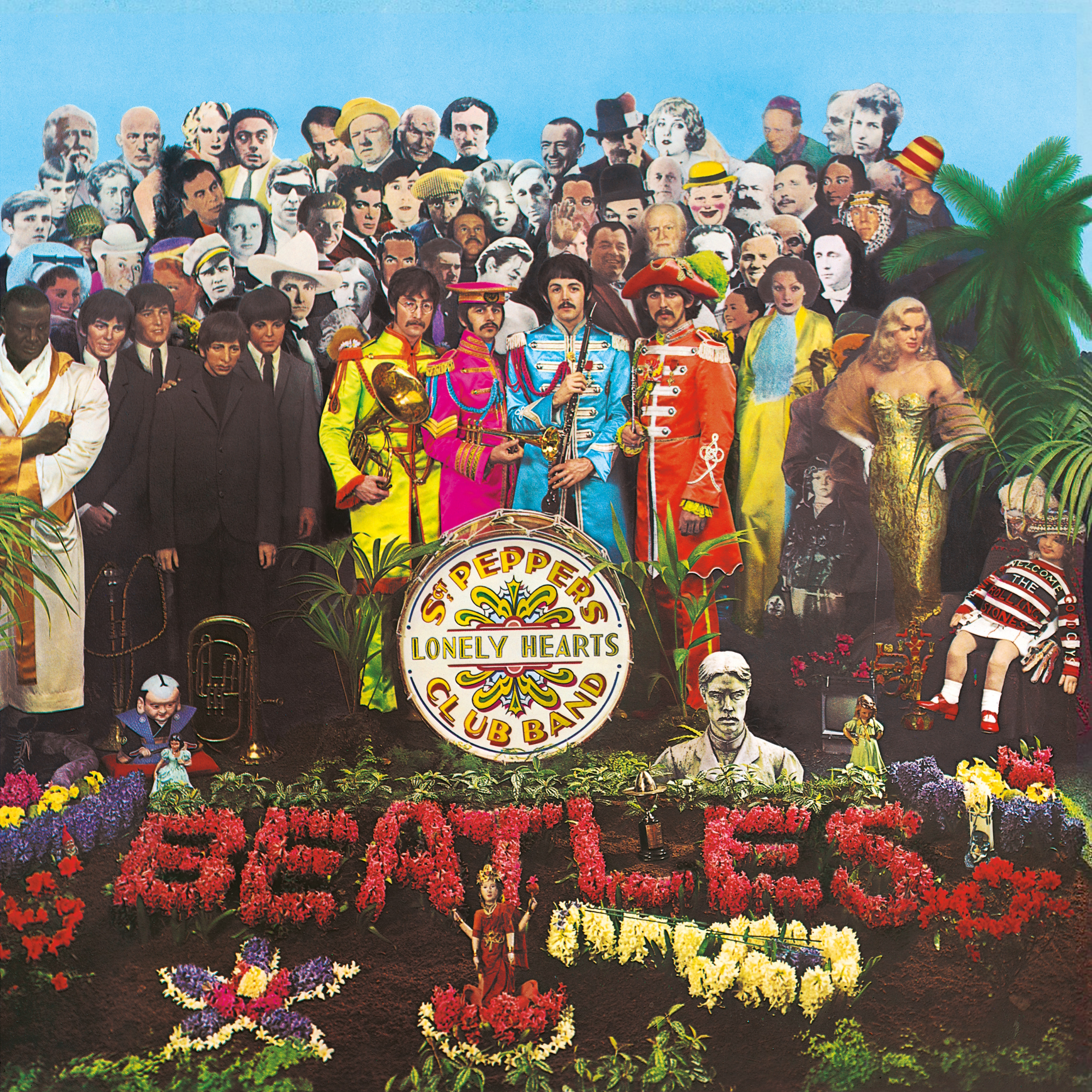
Cover for the Beatles' album Sgt. Pepper's Lonely Hearts Club Band, 1967

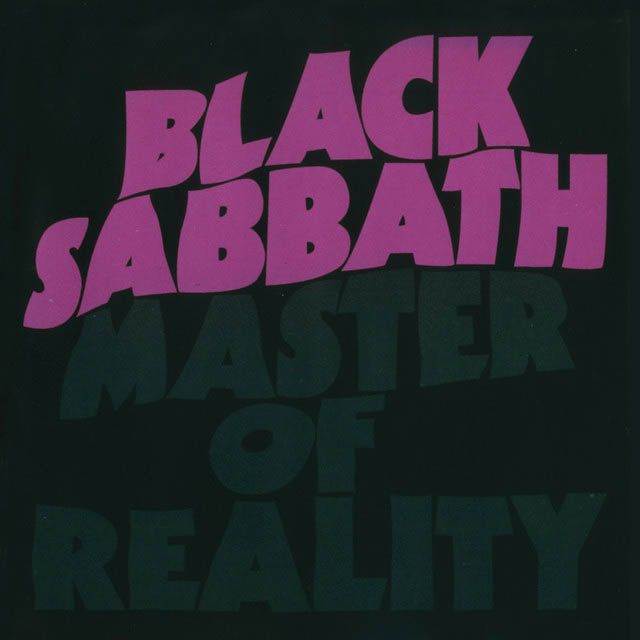
Cover for Black Sabbath's album Master of Reality, 1971

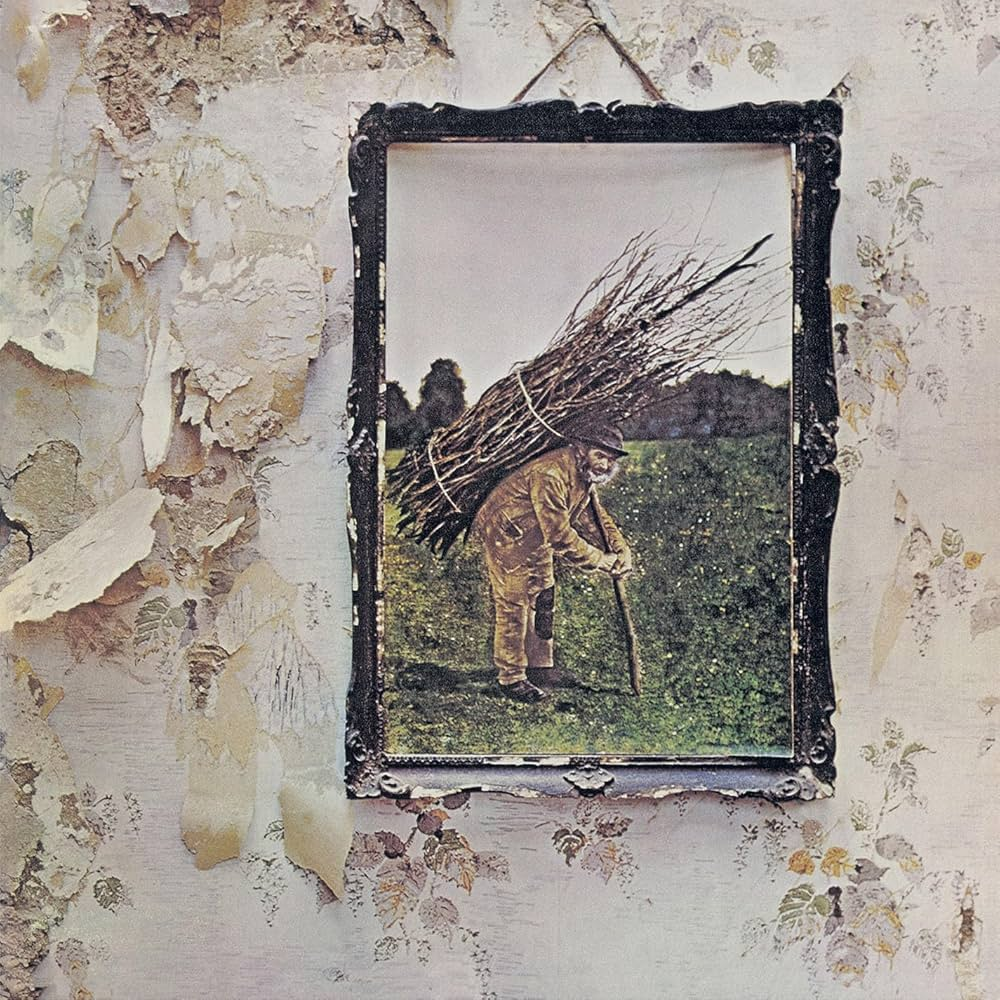
Cover for Led Zeppelin's untitled fourth album, 1971

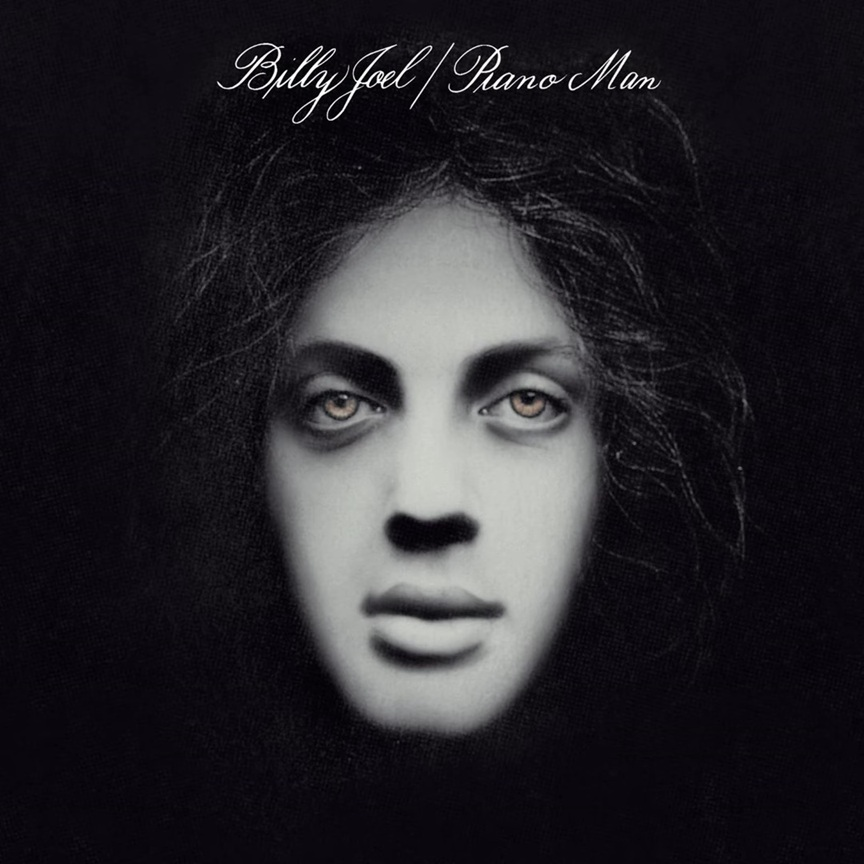
Cover for Billy Joel's album Piano Man, 1973

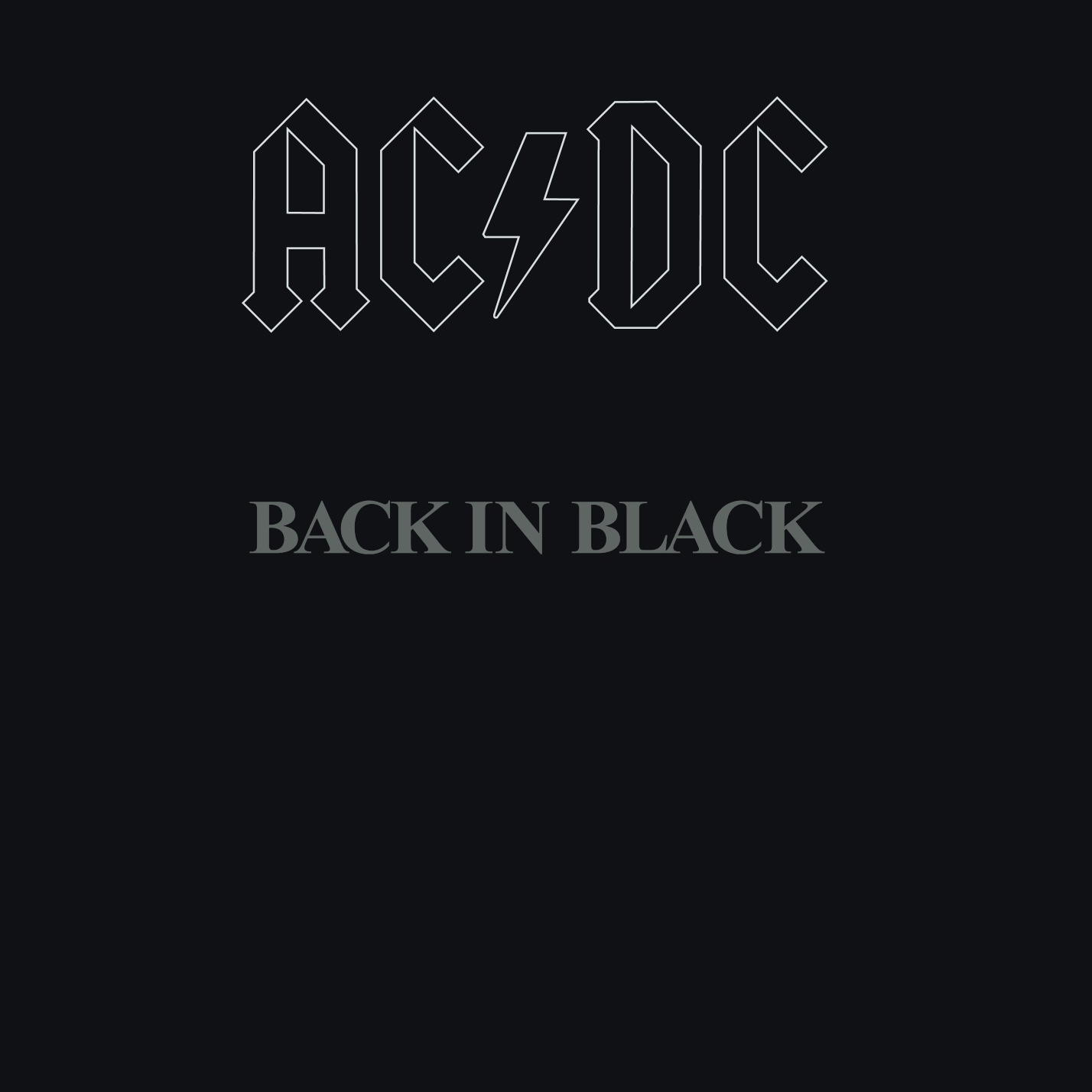
Cover for AC/DC's album Back in Black, 1980

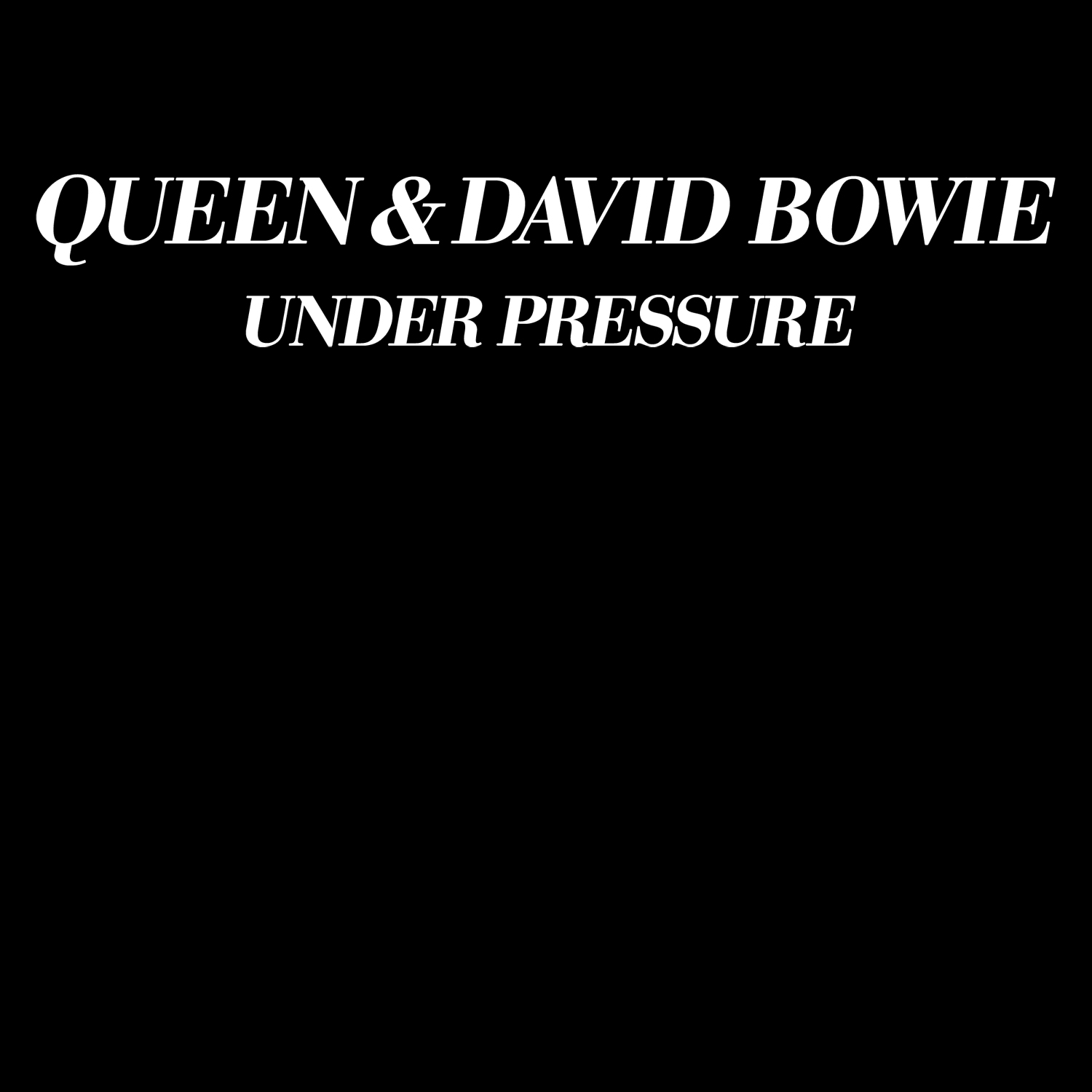
Cover for Queen and David Bowie's single "Under Pressure", 1981

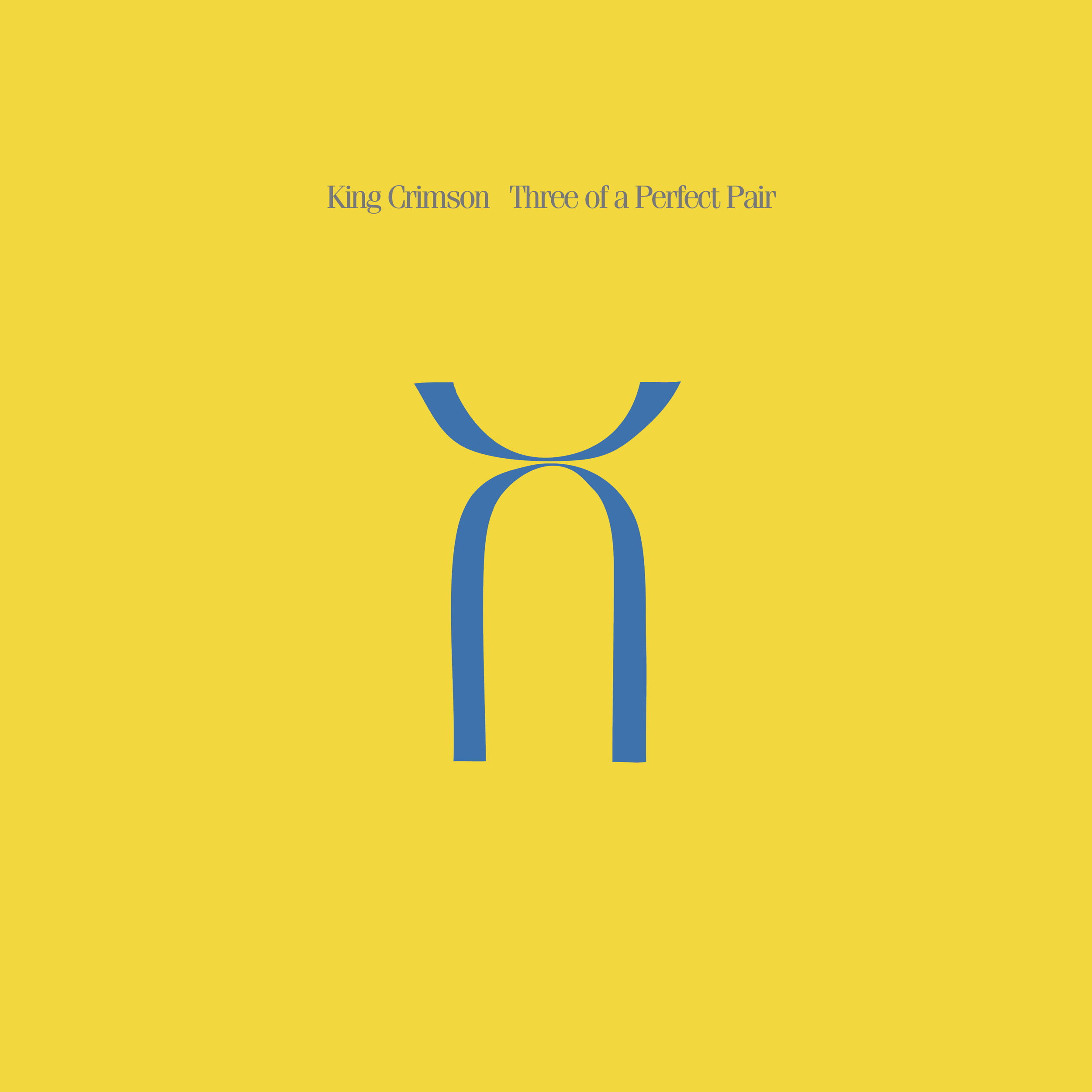
Cover for King Crimson's album Three of a Perfect Pair, 1984

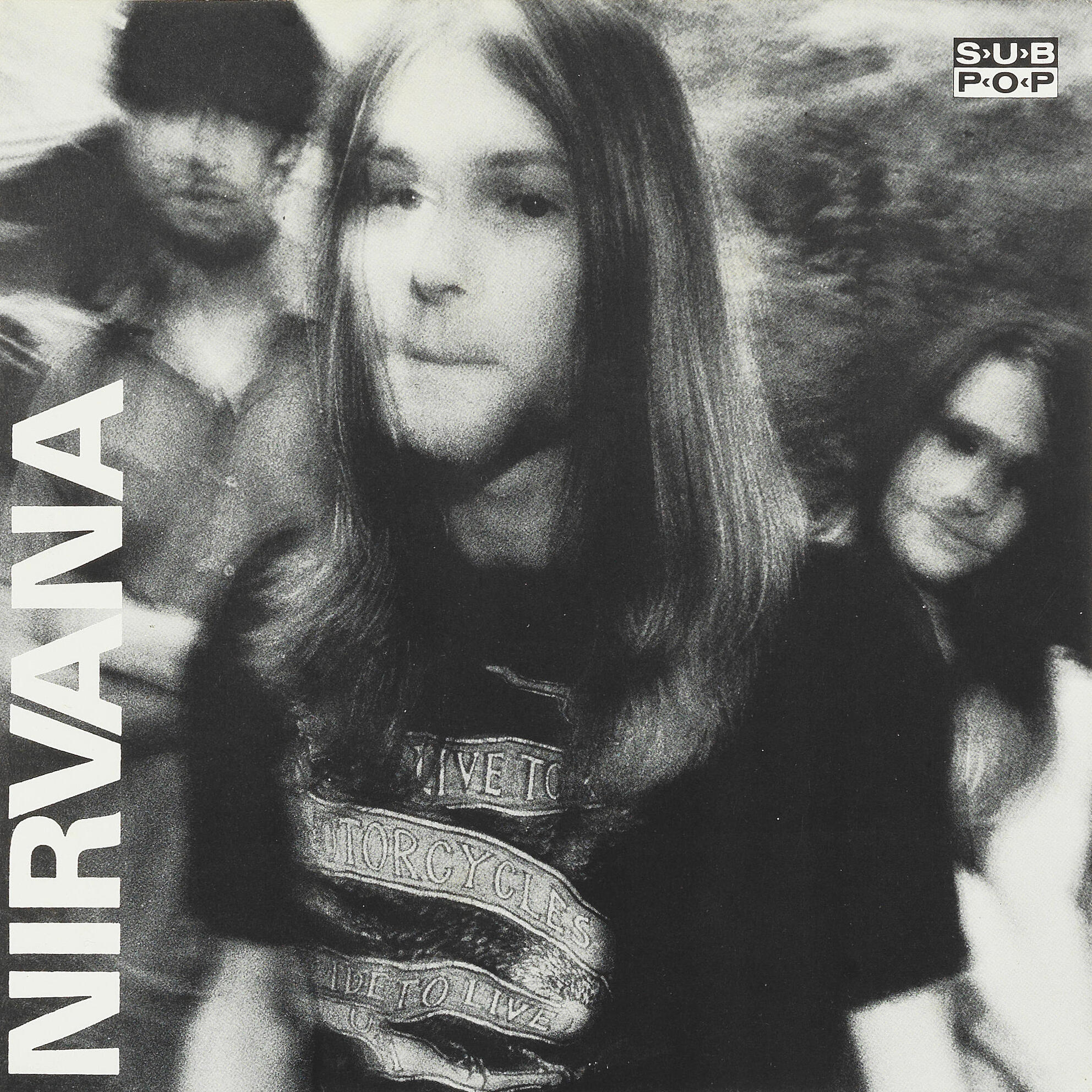
Cover for Nirvana's single "Love Buzz", 1988

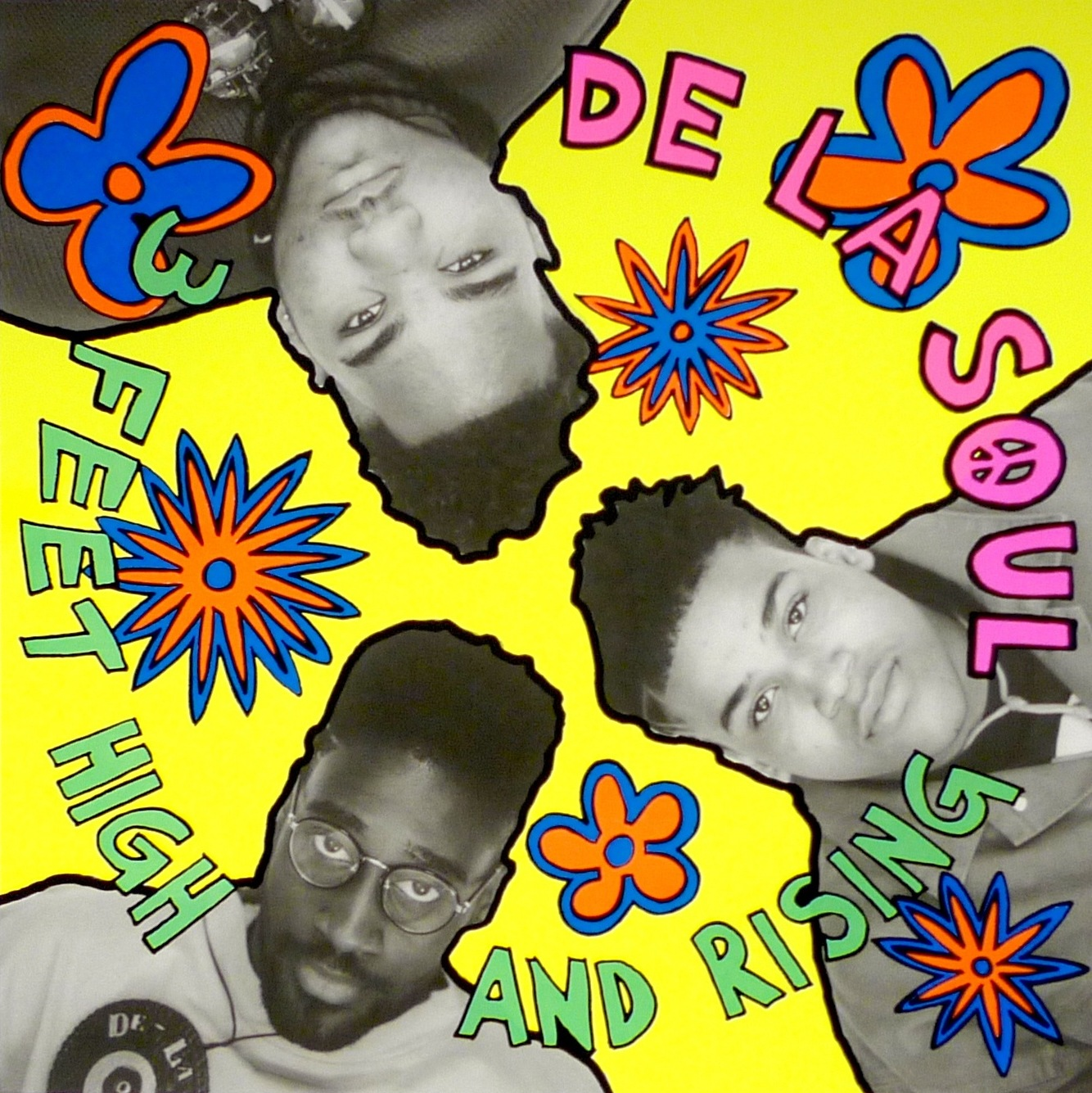
Cover for De La Soul's album 3 Feet High and Rising, 1989

Cover for Kino's untitled final album, 1990

Cover for The Features's debut EP The Features, 1997

Cover for Cymbals's album That's Entertainment, 2000

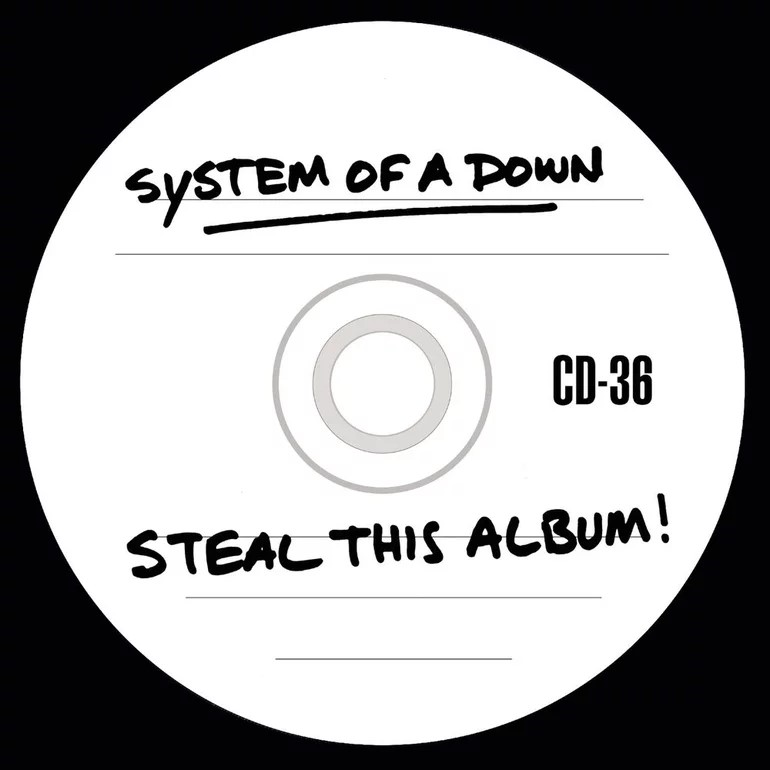
Cover for System of a Down's Steal This Album!, 2002

Cover for Self's free internet compilation Porno, Mint & Grime, 2005

Cover for I Fight Dragons's Cool is Just a Number, 2010

Cover for Beyoncé's eponymous album, 2013

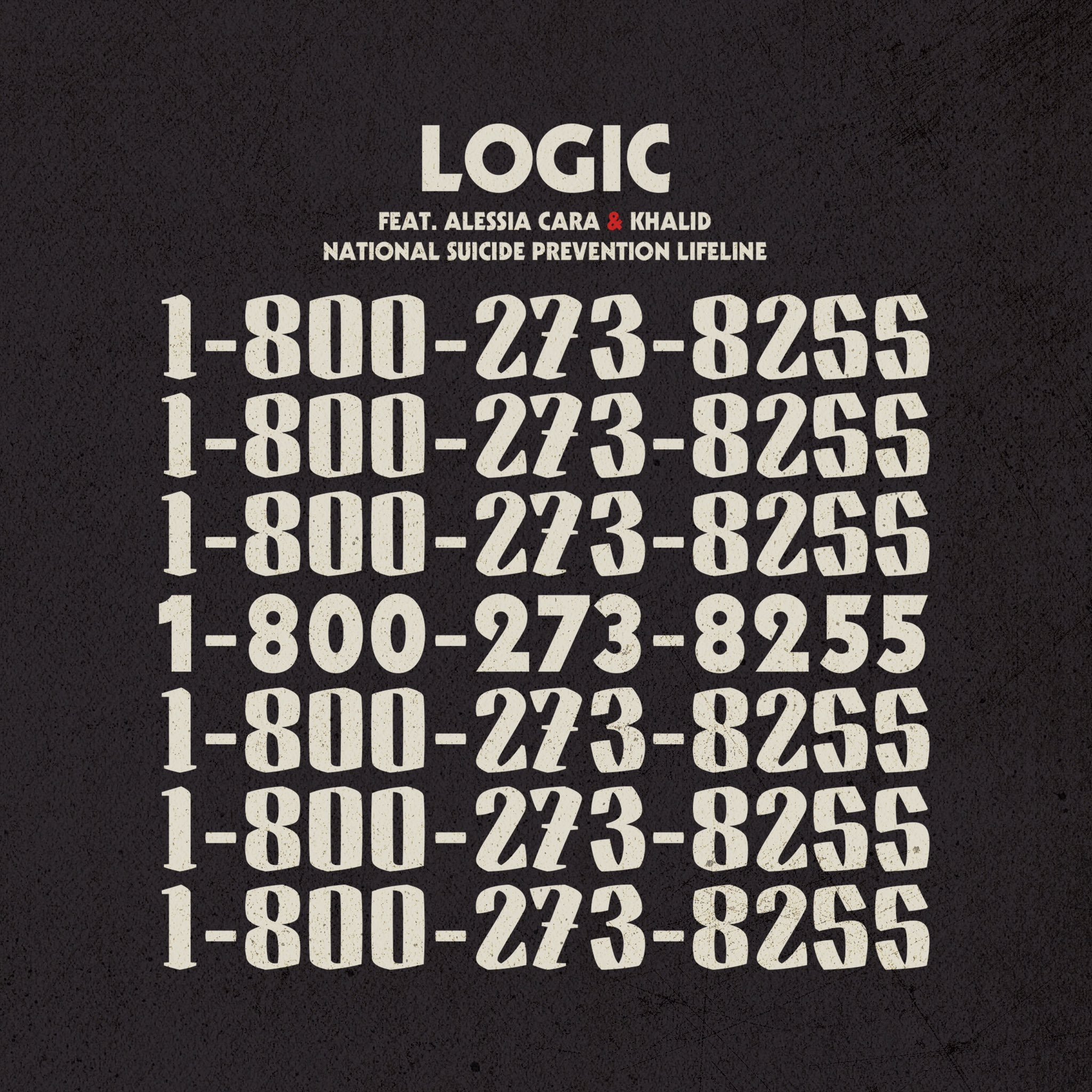
Cover for Logic's single "1-800-273-8255" featuring Alessia Cara and Khalid, 2017

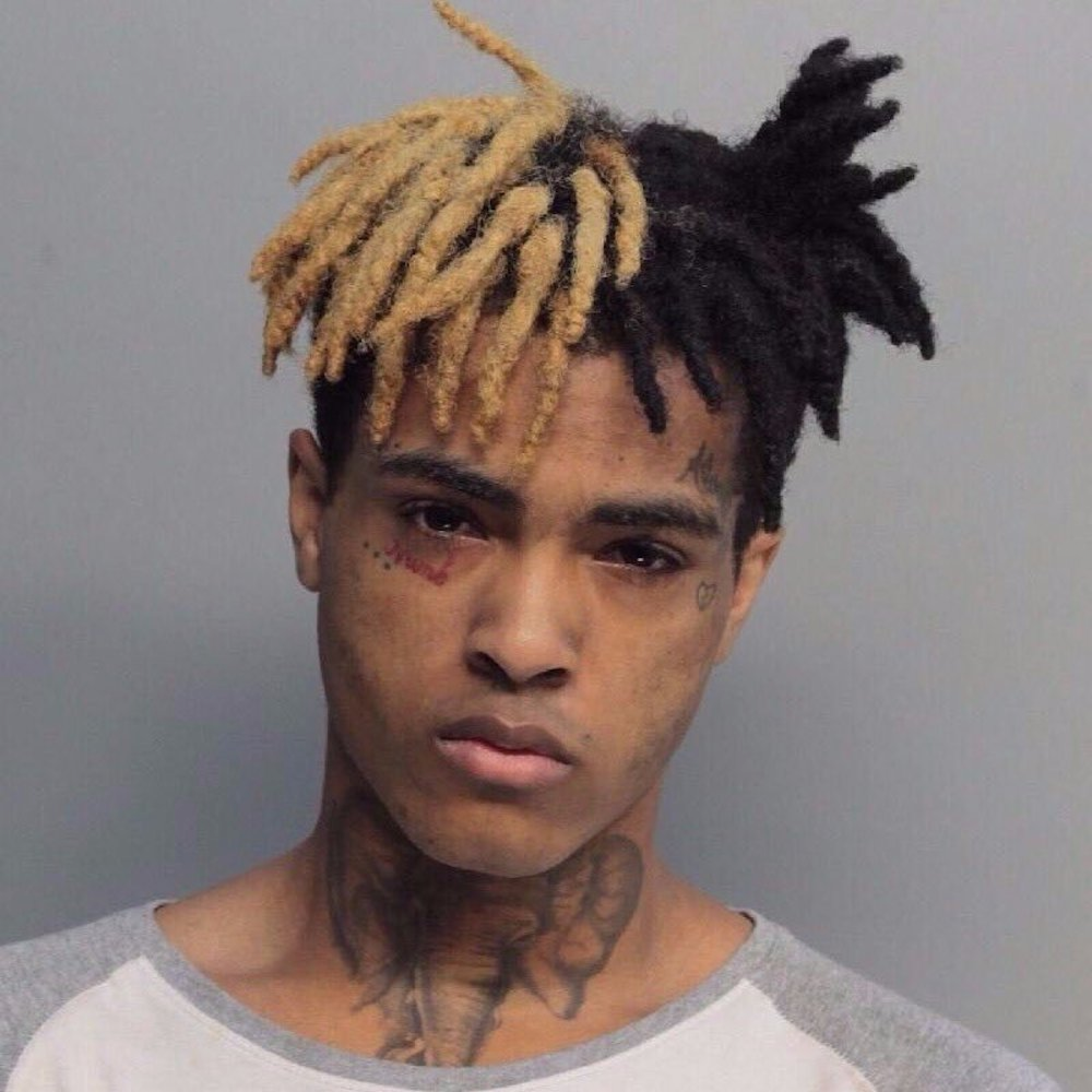
Cover for XXXTentacion's single "Look at Me!", 2017

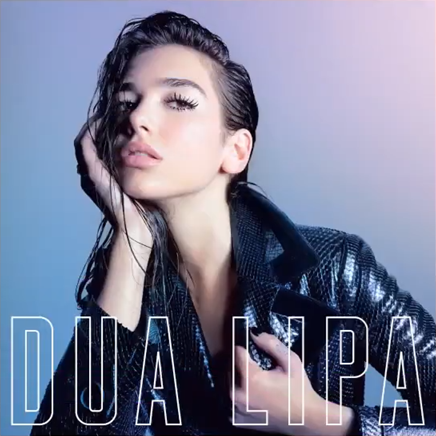
Cover for Dua Lipa's eponymous album, 2017

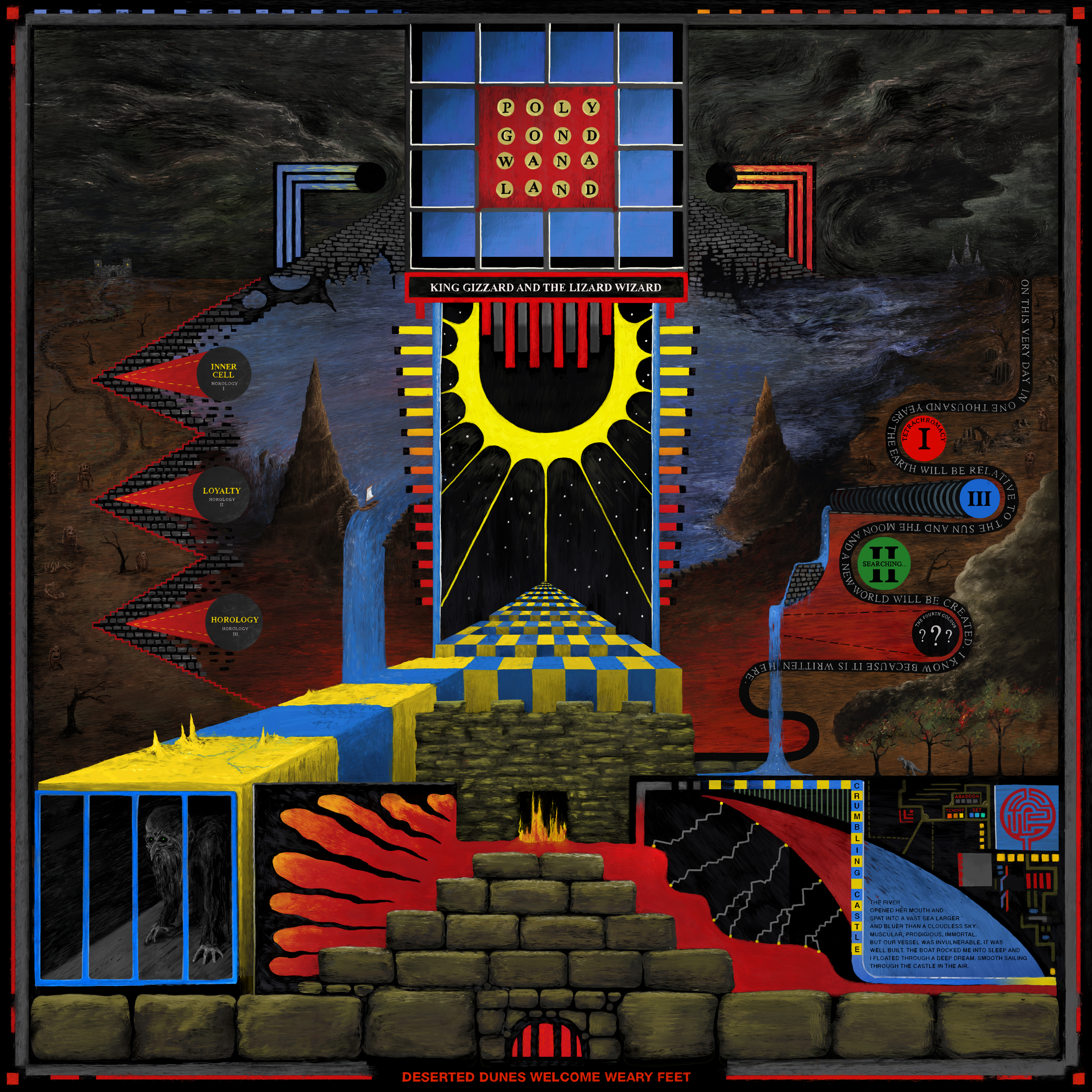
Cover for King Gizzard & the Lizard Wizard's album Polygondwanaland, 2017

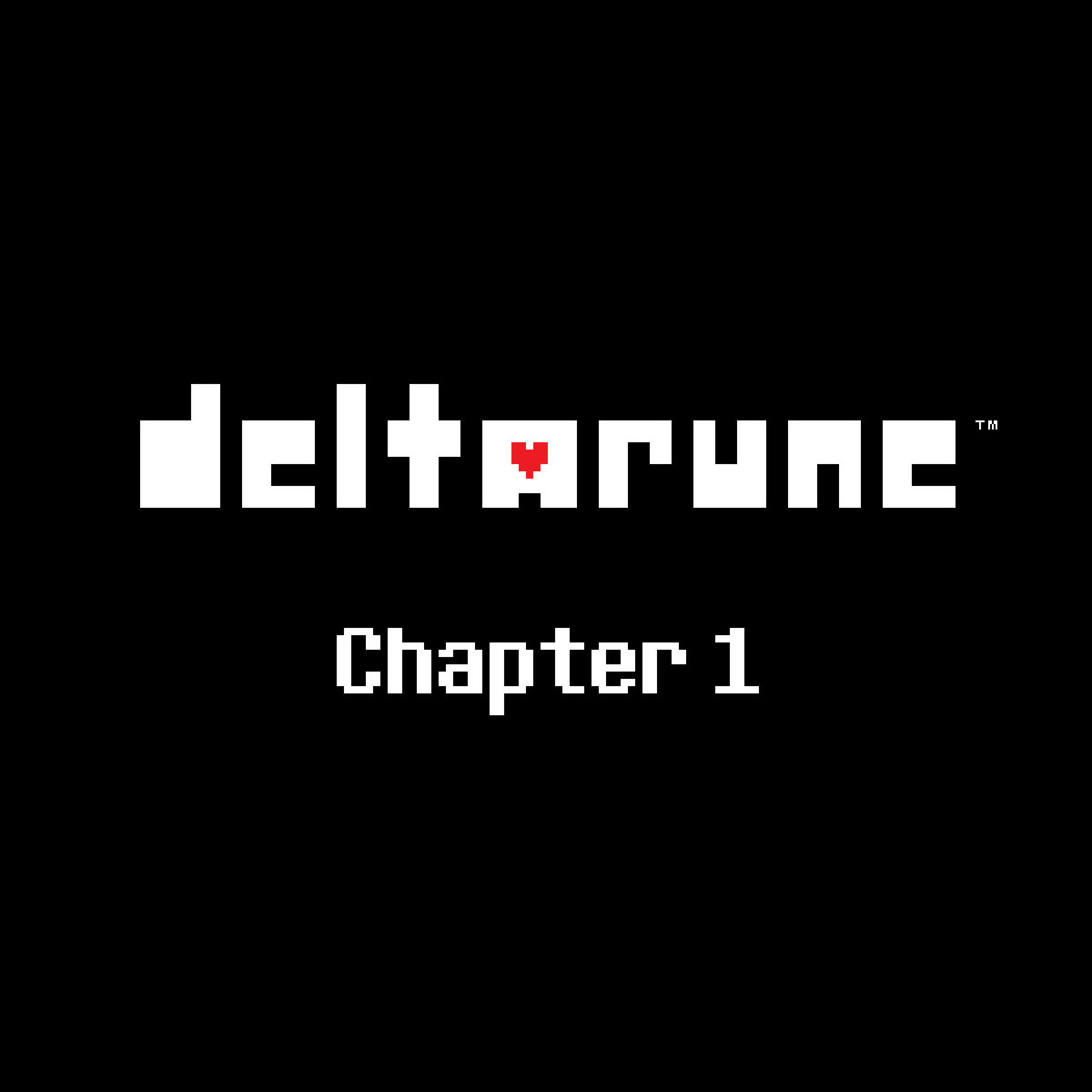
Cover for Toby Fox's soundtrack to the first chapter of Deltarune, 2018

Cover for Ecco2k's album E, 2019

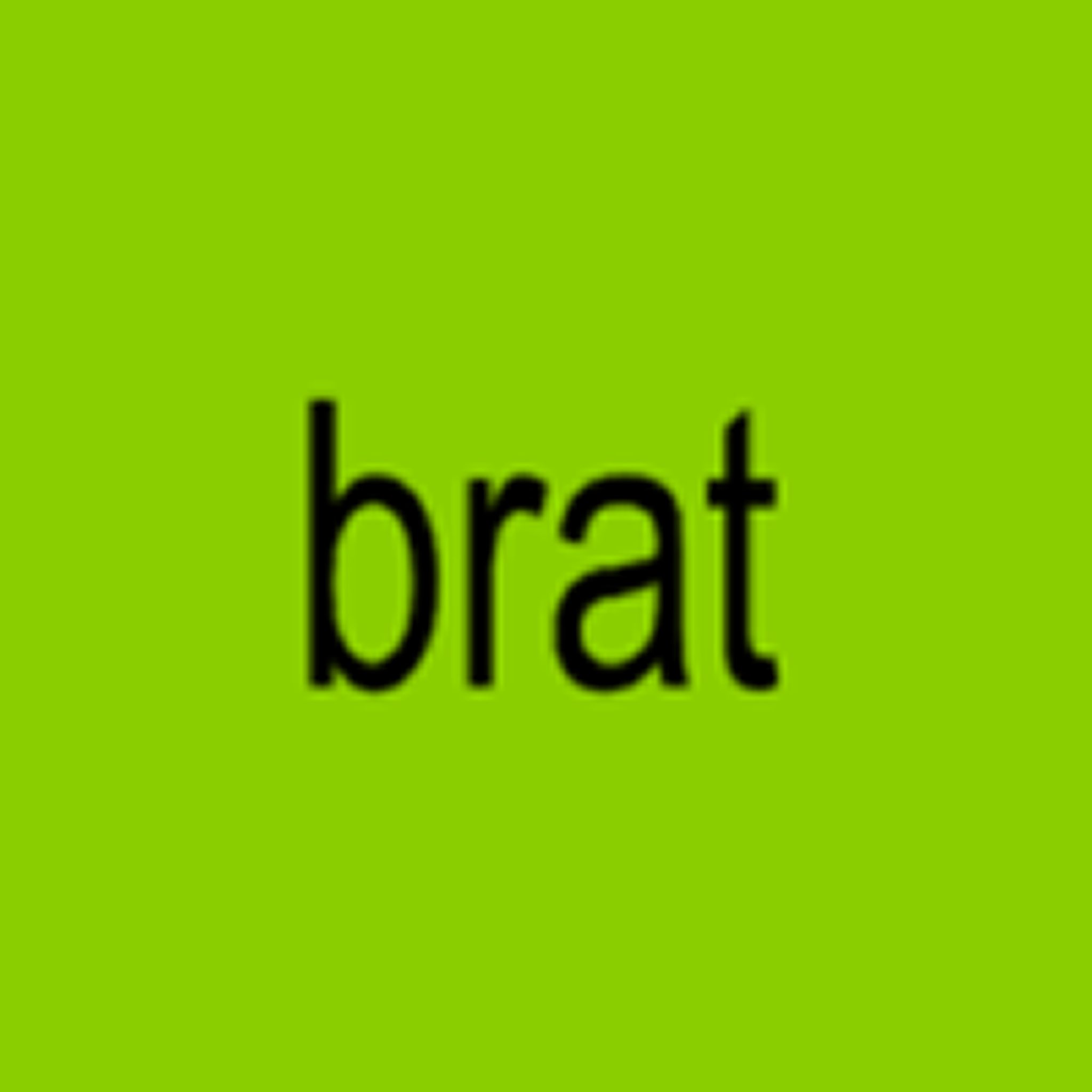
Cover for Charli XCX's album Brat, 2024

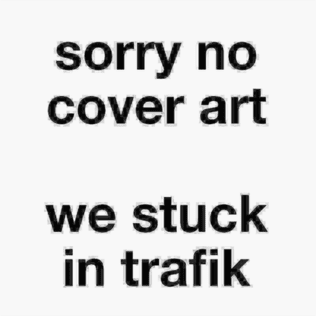
Cover for Käärijä and Joost Klein's single Trafik!, 2024

=== Video Games ===
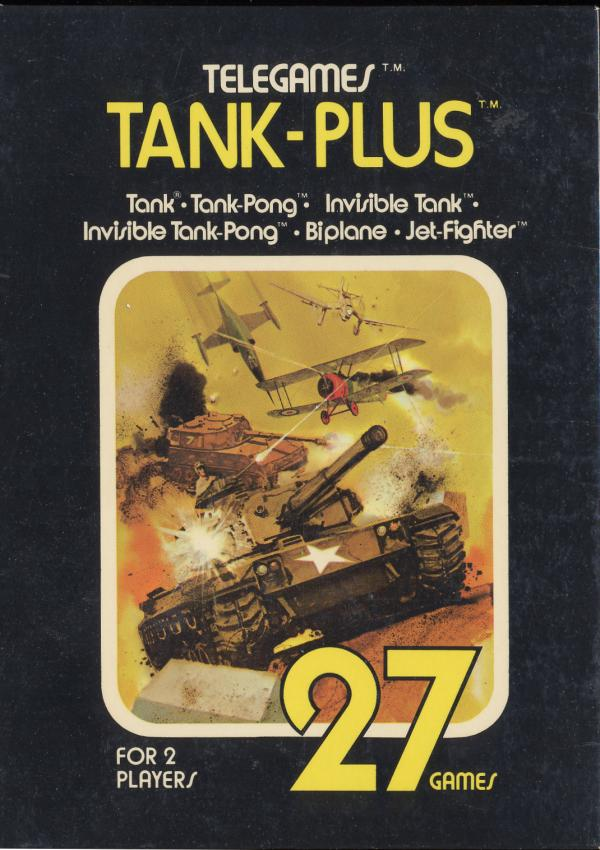
Tank-Plus (1977, Atari 2600)

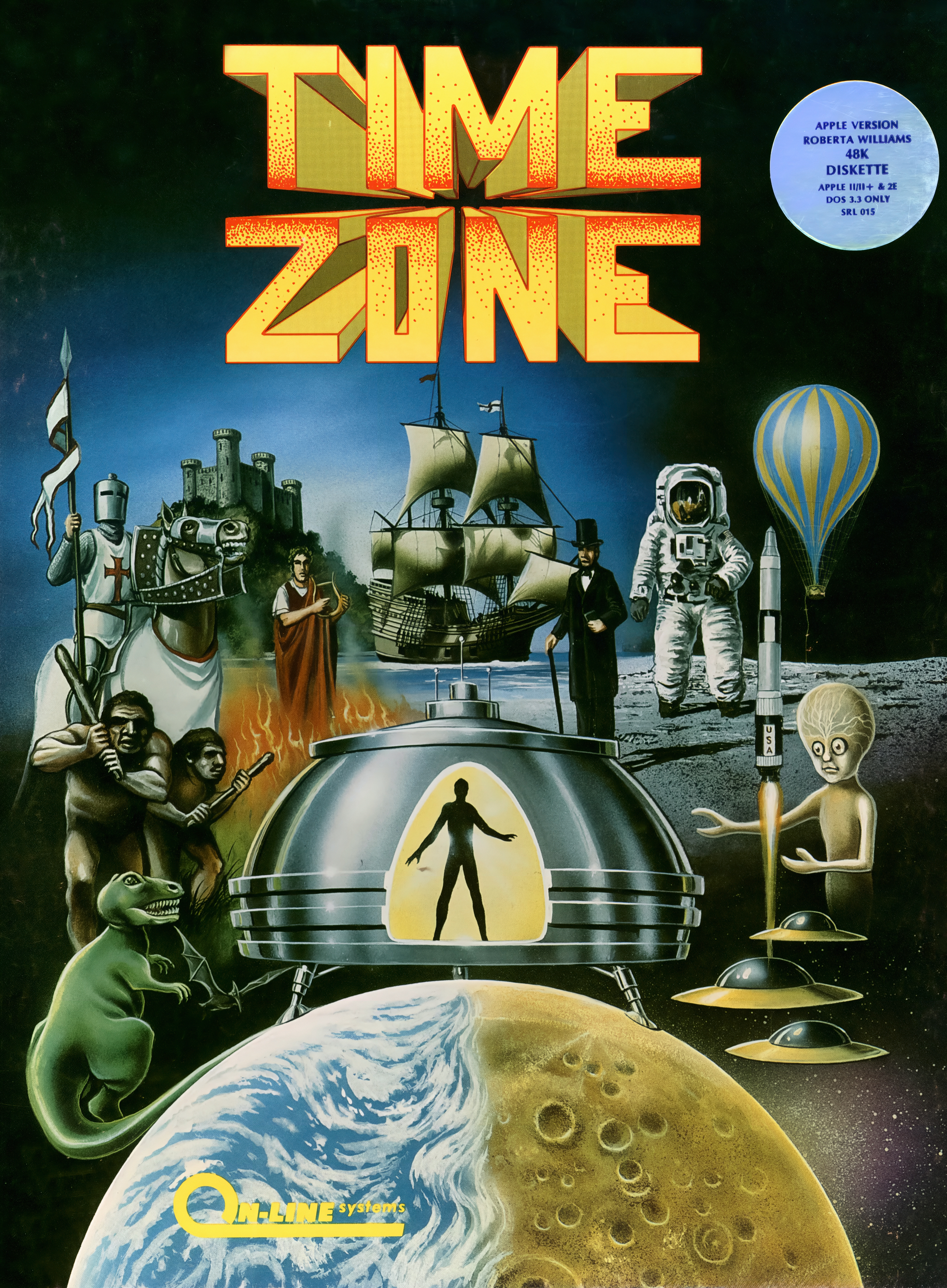
Time Zone (1982, Apple II)

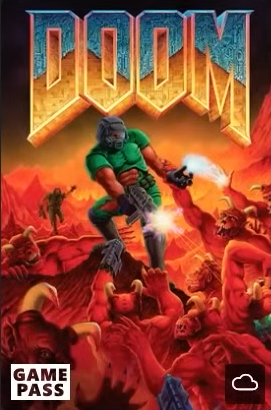
Doom (1993, illustrated by Don Ivan Punchatz, modified for Xbox Game Pass)

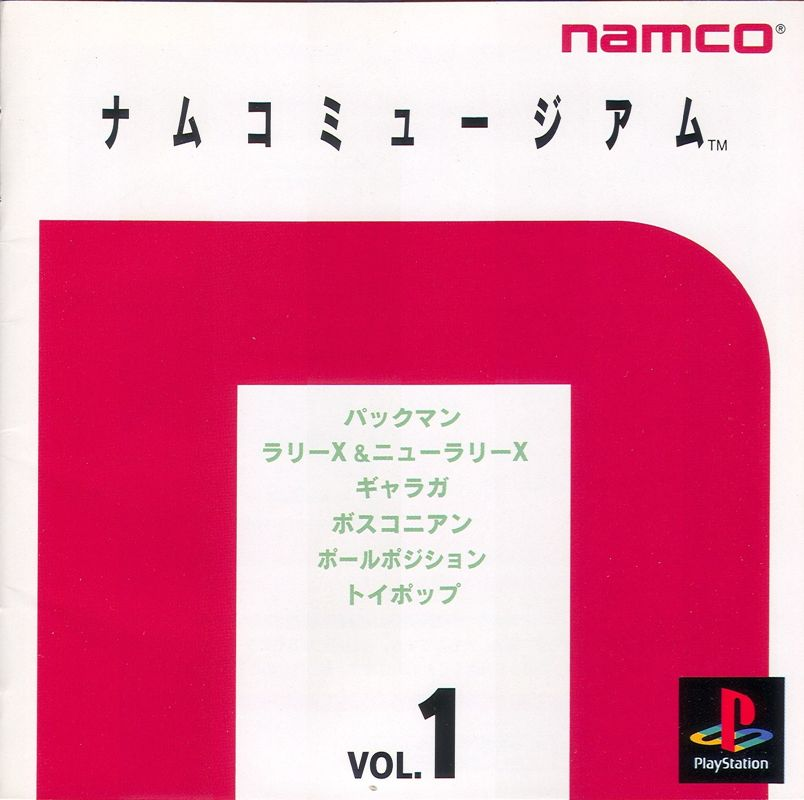
Namco Museum Vol. 1 (1995, PlayStation)

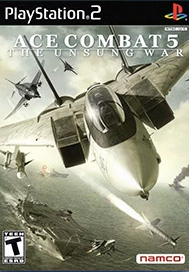
Ace Combat 5: The Unsung War (2004, PlayStation 2)

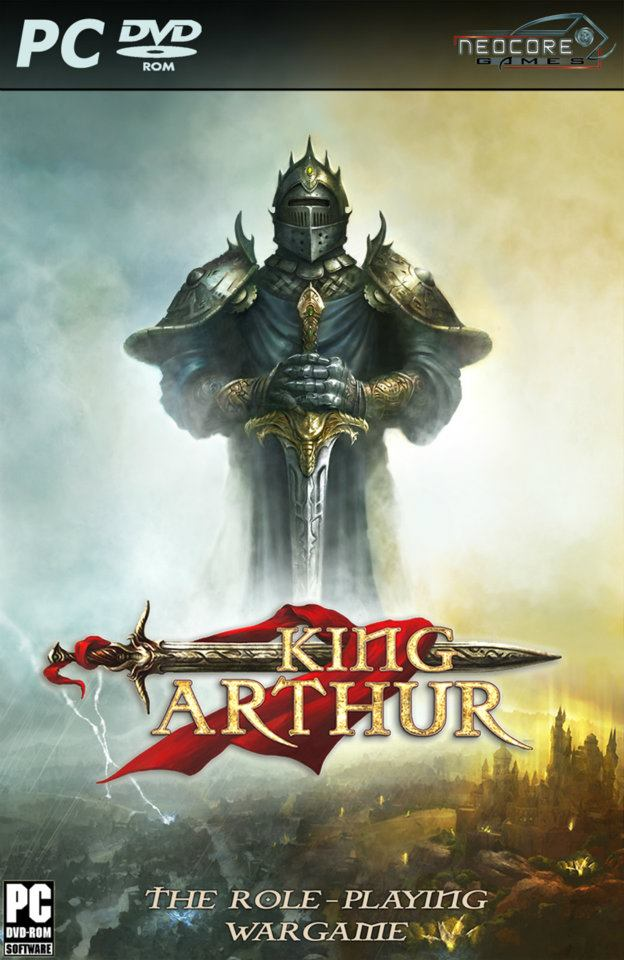
King Arthur: The Role-Playing Wargame (2009, Windows)

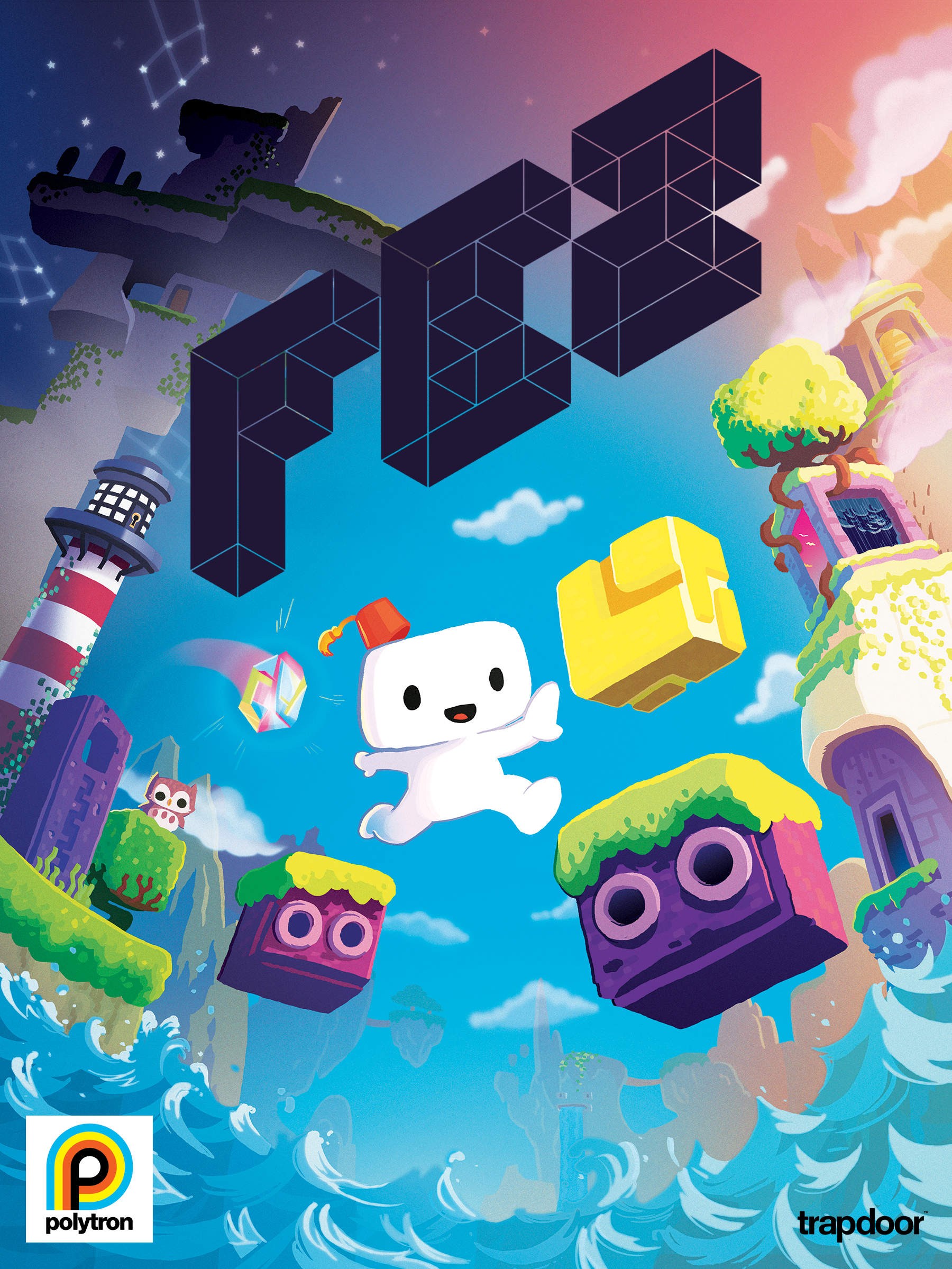
Fez (2012, multi-platform)

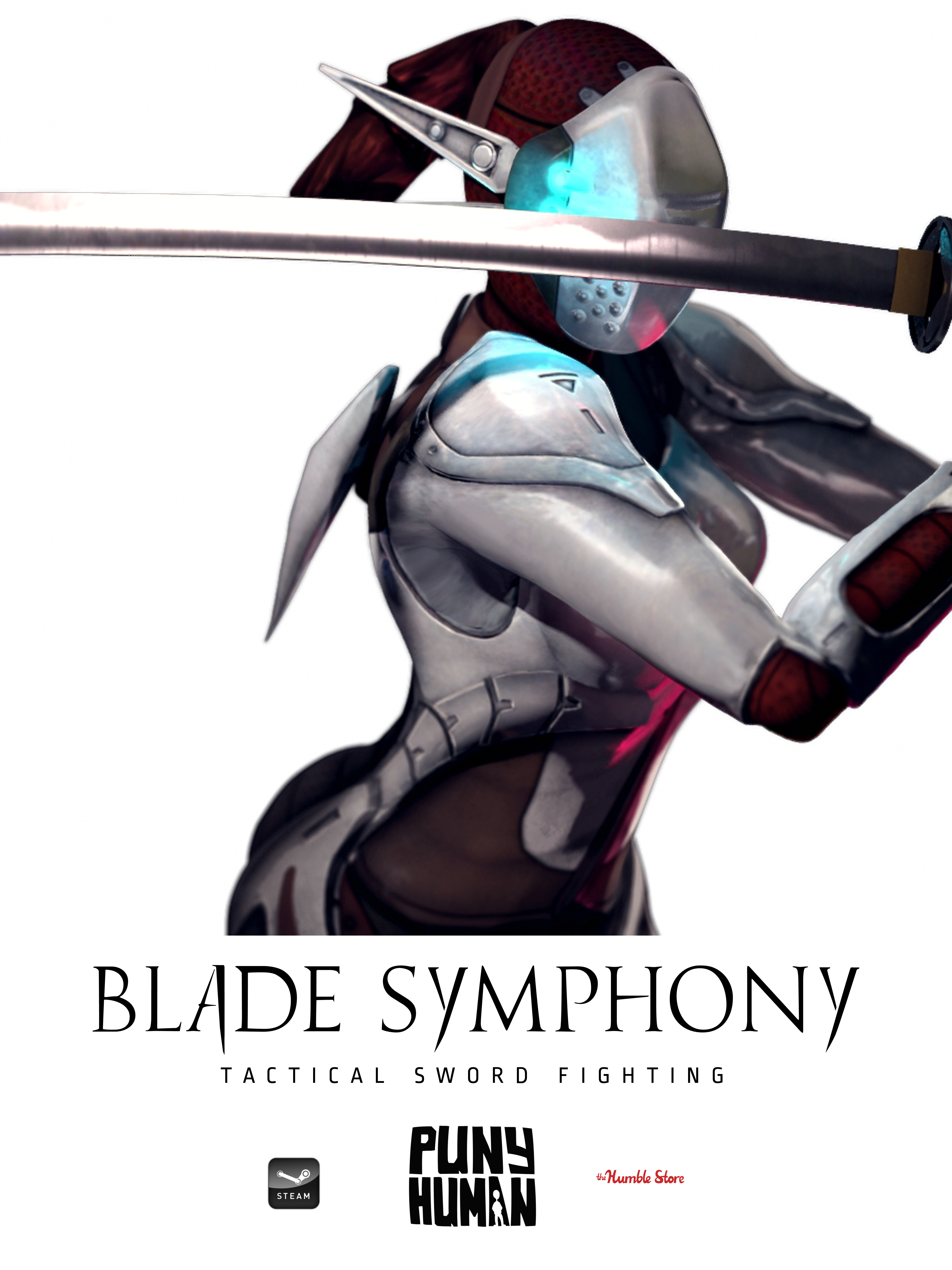
Blade Symphony (2014)

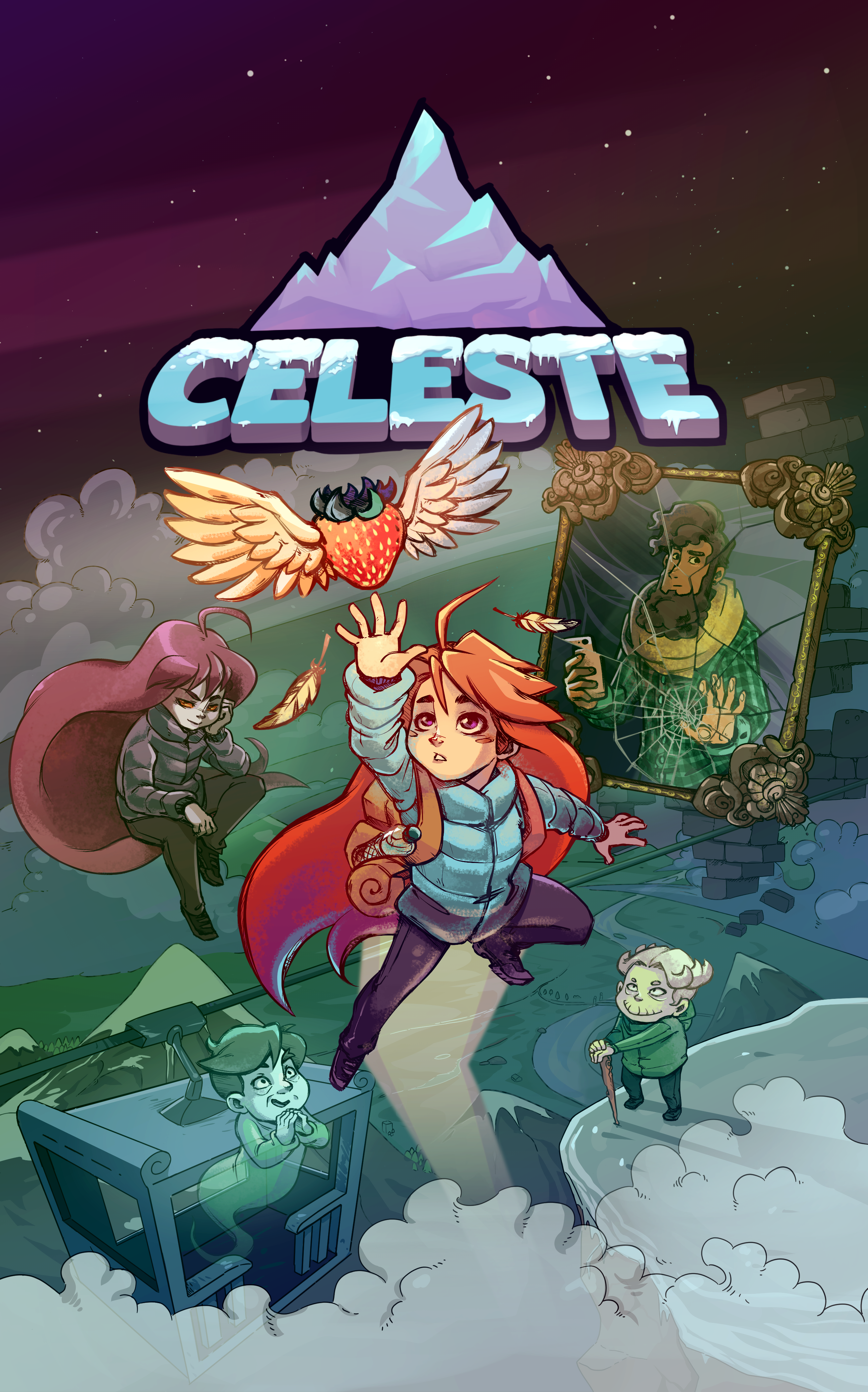
Celeste (2018)

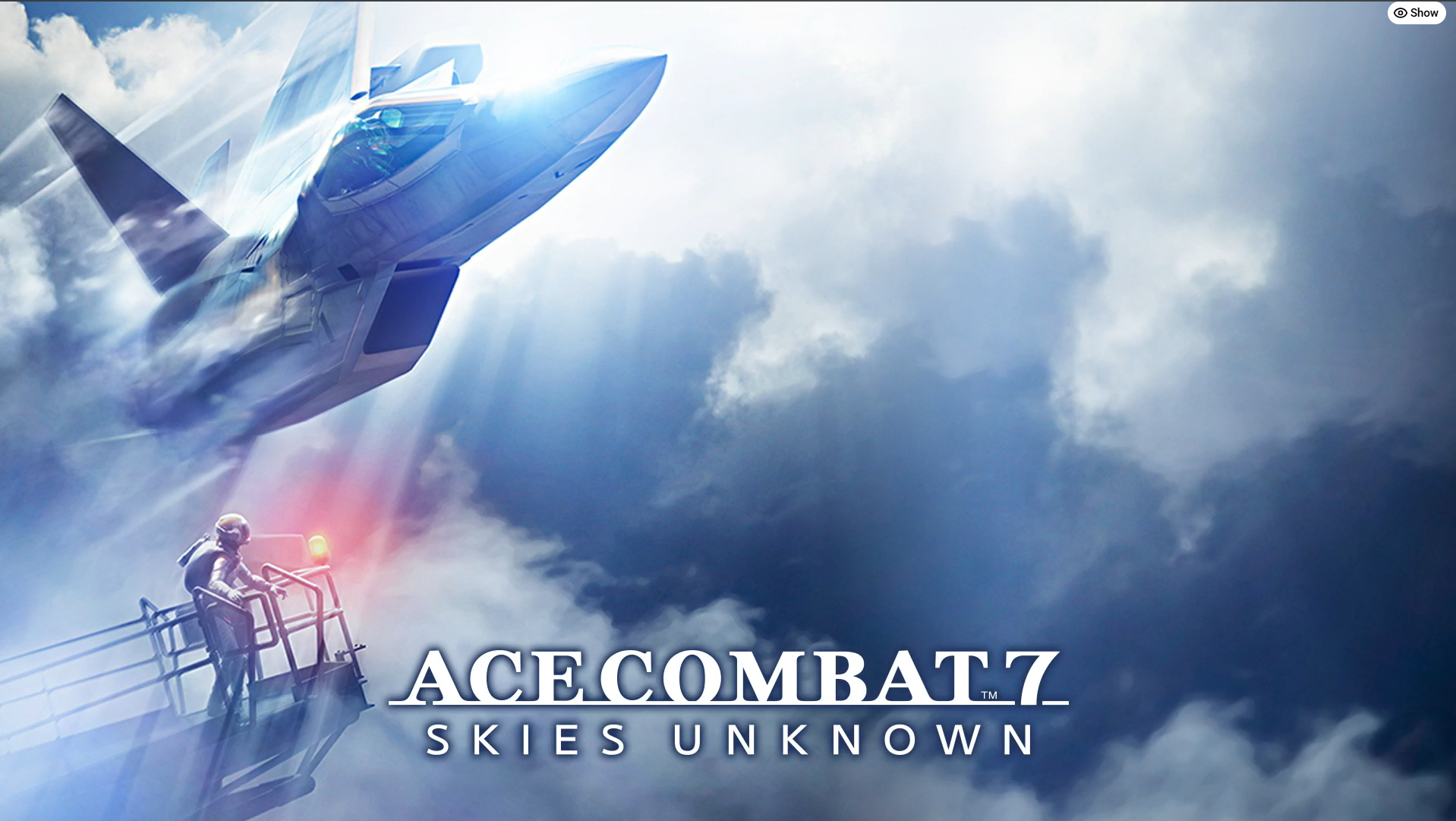
Ace Combat 7: Skies Unknown (2019, extended image from 2020 shown)

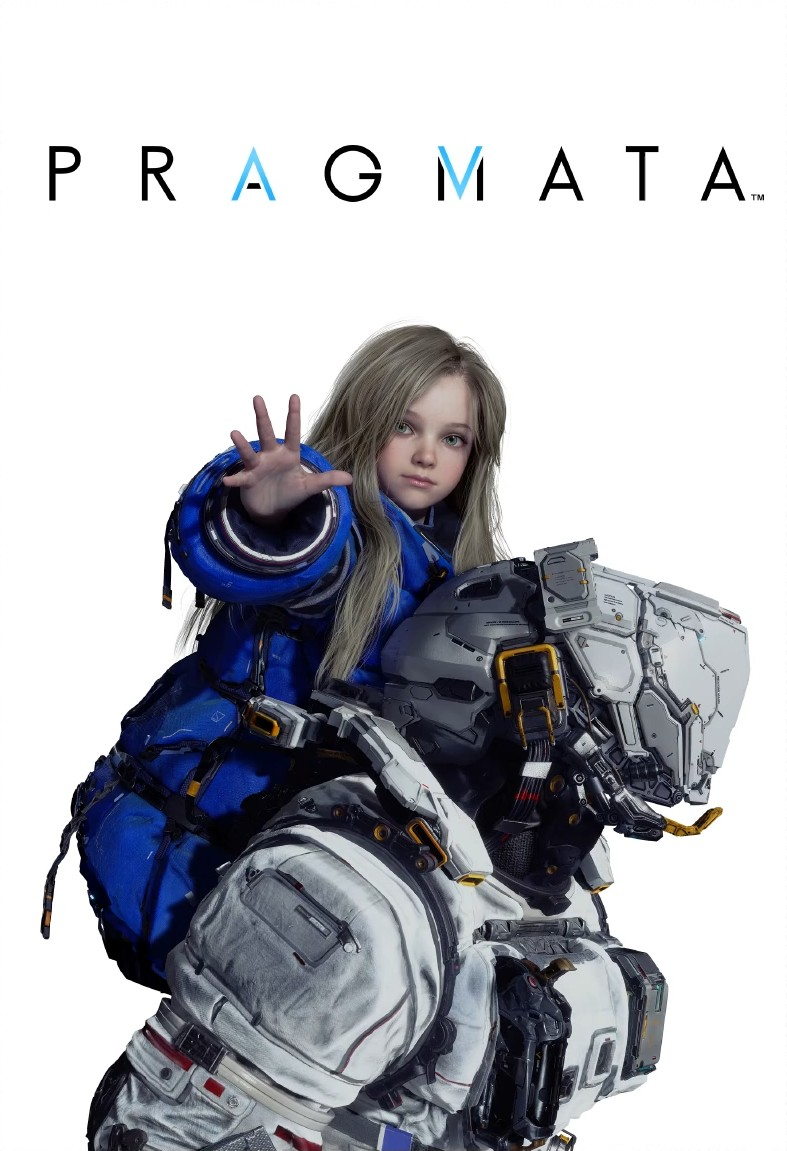
Pragmata (2026)

== See also ==
- Book cover
- Dust jacket
- History of graphic design
- List of controversial album art
- Video game packaging
