= Lottie Williams (actress, born 1866) =

American actress, singer, and dancer

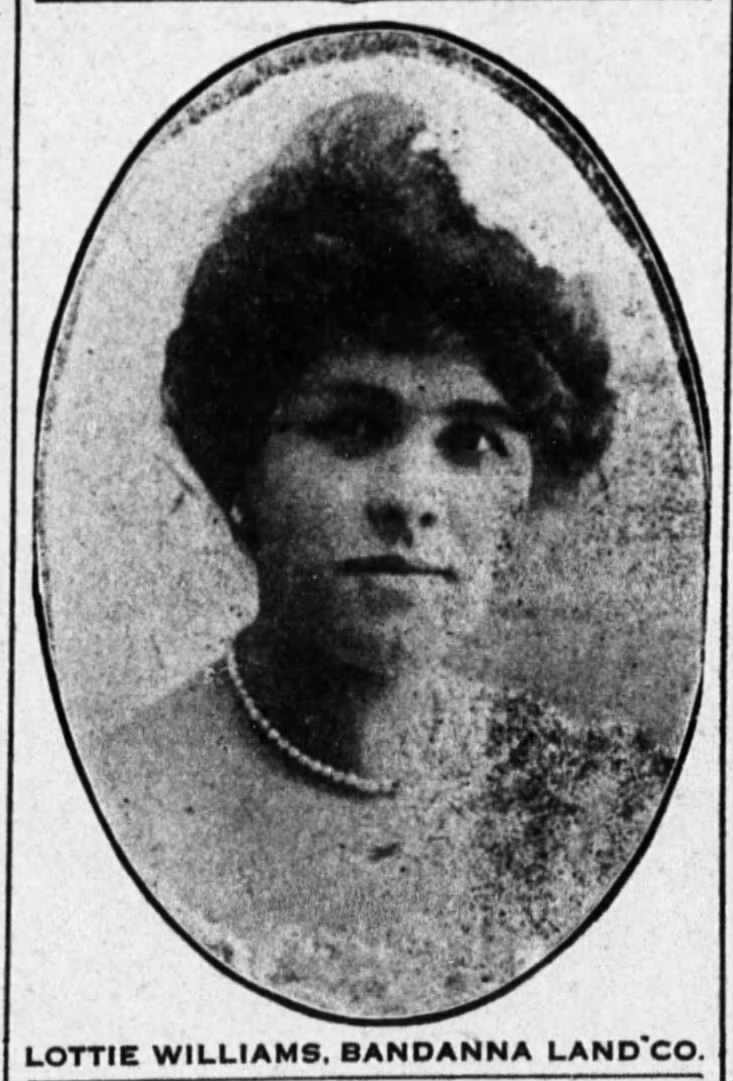
- Photograph of Lottie Williams published in The New York Age in 1908, the year of her retirement.
- Born: Charlotte Louise Johnson; 1866; Chicago, Illinois, U.S.
- Died: March 17, 1929 (aged 62–63); New York City, U.S.
- Other name: Lottie Thompson
- Occupations: Entertainer, actress, dancer
- Years active: 1898–1908
- Spouse: Bert Williams

Charlotte Louise Johnson, known as Lottie Williams and Lottie Thompson (1866 – March 17, 1929), was an American actress, singer, and dancer. A pioneering performer in African-American musical theater, she is best remembered for starring in several stage works with her second husband, Bert Williams, both on Broadway and in vaudeville. These included several musicals created by composer Will Marion Cook, lyricist Paul Laurence Dunbar, and the playwright Jesse A. Shipp; including Sons of Ham (1900), In Dahomey (1903), and Abyssinia (1906) among other works. In these musicals she portrayed mainly supporting character roles and was usually a featured singer and/or dancer. However, she portrayed the title role and the main protagonist in the Cook, Dunbar, and Shipp musical My Tom-Boy Girl (1905).

As a dancer, Williams was particularly associated with the cakewalk, and a sketch of her alongside her future husband in that dance was depicted on the front cover of the original sheet music for Scott Joplin's "Maple Leaf Rag" in 1899. She retired from the stage in 1908, but continued to provide support for her husband and his career. While the Williamses had no biological children of their own, the couple became the adoptive parents of three of Lottie's nieces after the death of her sister in 1913. She died at her home in Harlem in 1929.

== Early life ==
Lottie Williams was born with the name Charlotte Louise Johnson in Chicago in 1866. She was the daughter of Lewis Henry Johnson and Emily Junior, and was educated in the city of her birth. Her first marriage to a Chicago businessman named Mr. Thompson ended upon his death, and soon after this event she moved from Chicago to New York City.

== Career ==
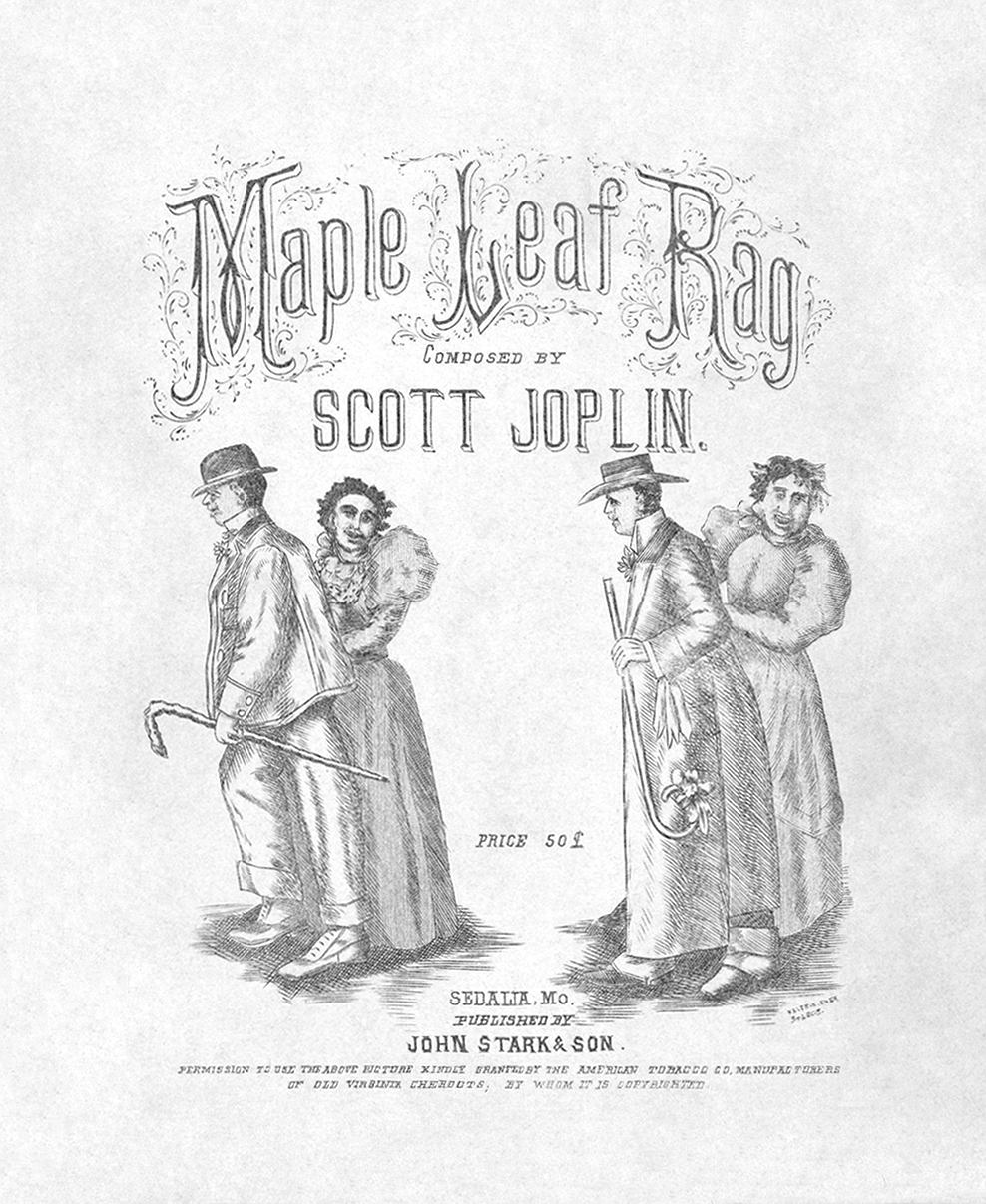
1899 sheet music publication of Scott Joplin's "Maple Leaf Rag". Bert and Lottie Williams (left), and George W. and Aida Overton Walker (right) are dancing the cakewalk in the image depicted on the front cover.

In 1898 Lottie joined Bert Williams and George Walker's theatrical company; first appearing with them in vaudeville under the name Lottie Thompson in Senegambian Carnival. It was during the rehearsals of this show that she began a romantic relationship with Bert Williams, and the pair married on September 21, 1899. After this she was credited on the stage as Lottie Williams.

Williams continued to perform in the Williams and Walker company for the next decade until she retired from the stage in 1908. With the company she appeared in several musicals crafted by composer Will Marion Cook, lyricist Paul Laurence Dunbar, and the playwright Jesse A. Shipp; including A Lucky Coon, The Policy Players (as Miss Gushington), Sons of Ham (as Gabby Slaughtry), In Dahomey (as Mrs Stringer), My Tom-Boy Girl (as Josie, a.k.a. the "Tom-Boy Girl"), and Abyssinia (as Miss Primly). Many of these shows had runs on Broadway in addition to touring the United States.

The musicals In Dahomey and Abyssinia in particular have been cited as two groundbreaking works in the evolution of the American musical comedy and two important early African-American musicals. In Abyssinia Lottie was the featured singer in the song "Answer's That You Don't Expect to Get" a song through which her character Miss Primly was used to critique and mock the social mores of respectability in relation to sex and marriage as placed on women, and in particular black women, in early 20th-century America. In In Dahomey she was featured as a cakewalk dancer, and her character of the widow Mrs Stringer was a comedic part in which she portrayed a fashion editor for the newspaper Beanville Agitator who was also a seller of "forsaken" sewing patterns. Lottie's association with the cakewalk dance began prior to In Dahomey. When Scott Joplin's "Maple Leaf Rag" was first published in 1899 she was one of four cakewalk dancers depicted on the cover of the sheet music.

In most of the Cook, Dunbar, and Shipp musicals Lottie was featured as a singer and dancer in supporting character roles. However, in My Tom-Boy Girl she was given the part of the central protagonist of Josie the 'Tom-Boy Girl'. A comedic part, the musical told the tale of a down and out New York City papergirl who unexpectedly inherits a fortune tied to an estate in Virginia. After moving into her inherited mansion, her sister Lillian is kidnapped for ransom and in order to win her back she disguises herself as the miscreant "Ragged Joe" to infiltrate the gang of criminals who have taken her captive. This particular show toured nationally before reaching New York City where it first played at the Metropolis Theatre in the Bronx prior to appearing on Broadway at the Fourteenth Street Theatre in May 1905.

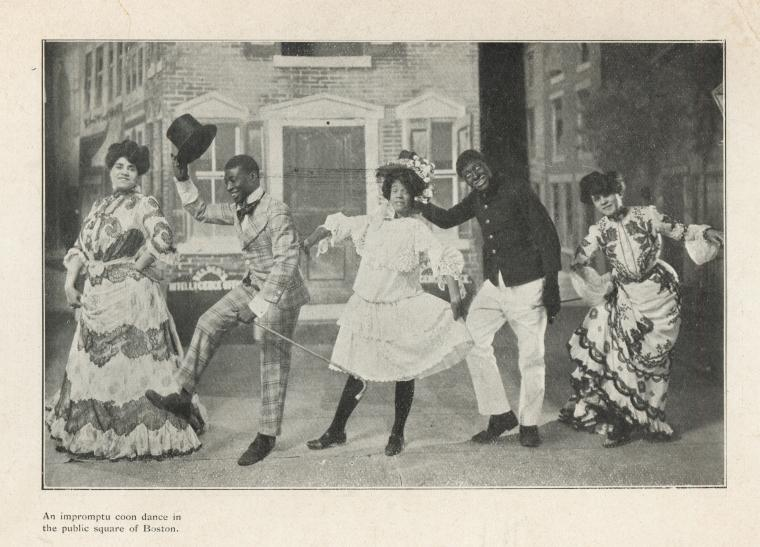
From left to right, performers Hattie McIntosh, George Walker, Aida Overton Walker, Bert Williams, and Lottie Williams performing the cake walk dance in the 1903 Broadway production of In Dahomey.

== Later life and death ==
In 1908 health issues forced Williams to retire from the stage, and after this she dedicated herself to supporting her husband's career behind the scenes, and taking care of Bert's elderly parents who moved from California into Bert and Lottie's home in Harlem. Lottie and Bert had no children of their own, but in the spring of 1913 Lottie's sister, Carrie, died and Lottie and Bert became the guardians of her three daughters: Charlotte, Eunice, and Laura. To make room for their expanding family the Williamses purchased a larger four-story brownstone in Harlem, and the couple welcomed the children into their new home as their adoptive parents.

Bert Williams died in 1922, and Lottie Williams died seven years later on March 17, 1929, at their home at 2309 Seventh Avenue in Harlem. She is buried next to her husband in Woodlawn Cemetery.
