= Tom Lemonier =

Tom Lemonier (March 29, 1870 — March 14, 1945) was an actor and composer of popular music during the ragtime era, particularly active in Black Vaudeville. His work featured in various musicals. Some of his work was published by the Gotham-Attucks Music Publishing Company.

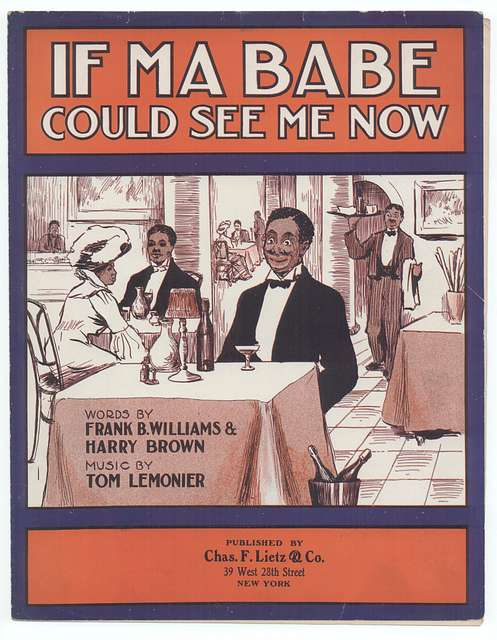
Cover for song "If Ma Babe Could See Me Now", music by Tom Lemonier 1905

== Early life ==
Thomas Lemonier was born on March 29th, 1869 in Manhattan, New York to parents William and Sarah. Lemonier has one brother, William. Lemonier's grandfather, Augustus, was enslaved in Cuba before moving to New York City and falling in love with a woman. Augustus owned a tobacco shop in Hester Street in the Lower East Side neighborhood.

Lemonier first got into music by playing the piano as a boy, but was well known in the city due to his harmonica skill.<refname="kulture1"/>

== Career ==
Numerous recordings of his songs were made including on Victor Records and Columbia Records. In 1909 he joined the staff of music publisher Rose & Snyder.

Lemonier became one of the first African-American actors to perform in a Caucasian play when in 1910 he was hired to play a steward in William A. Brady's production of Over Night. Previously these characters had been performed in blackface. Lemonier's abilities and the positive reception he received convinced Brady to hire additional African-American actors for the role in touring versions of the show.

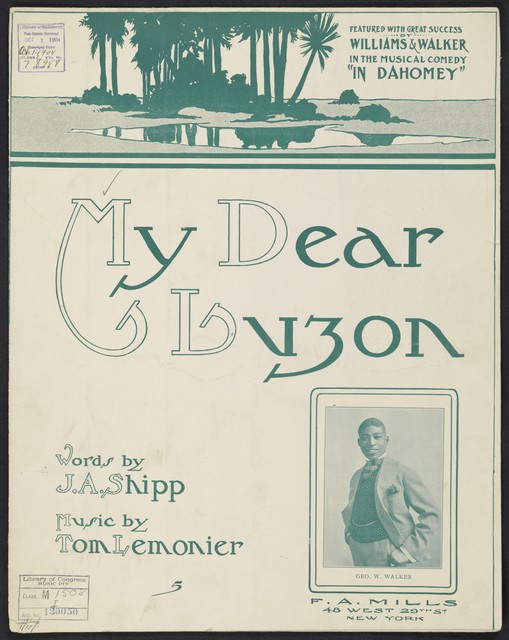
My-dear-luzon song, music by Tom Lemonier, with photo of George Walker

Playbill notes him as a performer in the 1912 musical Little Miss Brown. In addition to the original production, he was part of a national tour of this show. In 1915 Lemonier wrote the anthem, entitled Praise God We Are Not Weary, for the National Half Century Exposition and Lincoln Jubilee.

Lemonier collaborated with various other musicians and lyricists to produce compositions. In 1917, Lemonier established a sheet music business with Lew Payton and Tom Brown. He appeared on radio station WGY in 1923 as a whistler. In 1926 he was concentrating entirely on sacred music.

== Views on Civil rights ==
Lemonier opined that Civil rights should be acquired over a period of time, and that forcing the issue would generate hatred instead of progress.

== List of selected compositions ==
- Adopted Child, with W. J. Carle, music; words by Henry Creamer. Recorded 1912 by Bob Roberts.
- Dear Old Moonlight, music; words by Henry Creamer. Recorded by the Peerless Quartet.
- Good Afternoon, Mr. Jenkins, music; words by Cecil Mack. Recorded 1901 by George Walker.
- Honey Lou, music; lyrics by Ed Rose. Recorded 1908 by Collins & Harlan. Joel Whitburn estimates the Victor Records version was the sixth best selling recording of late January, 1909.
- I Wonder What Makes It Snow, music; lyrics by Tom Brown. Recorded 1904 by Billy Murray.
- I'd Like to Be a Real Lady. Recorded 1908 by Collins & Harlan.
- I'll Be Your Dewdrop Rosey, music; words by Richard H. Gerard. Included in show "Foxy Grandpa", where originally performed by Joseph Hart and Carrie DeMar.
- I'm Just Barely Livin', Dat's All, music; words by Harry Brown. Recorded 1904 by Bob Roberts.
- In My Old Home (in Dixie Land), music; words by Mord Allen. Performed by Bert Williams.
- Is Everybody Happy? (1905) with Ernest Hogan, music; words by Frank Williams. Included in musical play Rufus Rastus. Recorded circa 1905 by Arthur Collins.
- Junie, music; words by Cecil Mack. Recorded 1901 by George Walker.
- Just One Word of Consolation, with Frank B. Williams. Recorded 1906 by Harry Tally. Recorded 1911 by Will Oakland. Recorded 1928 by Scrappy Lambert. Recorded 1936 by Bing Crosby.
- Lovie Dear, music; words by Fred Bonny. Originally performed by Aida Overton Walker.
- Mary Ellen, music; words by Alfred Bryan. Recorded 1904 by Billy Murray.
- Miss Hannah from Savannah, music; words by Cecil Mack. Originally performed by Aida Overton Walker.
- My Cabin Door, music; words by Grant Stewart. Originally performed by Hattie Williams and Sam Bernard in musical production The Rollicking Girl
- My Dear Luzon, music; words by Jesse A. Shipp. Featured in Broadway musical In Dahomey.
- Play That Rag, music; words by Ed Rose. Recorded 1908 by Collins and Harlan.
- Sweetness, music; words by Henry Creamer. Recorded 1910 by the Peerless Quartet.
- That Was Me, music; words by Ed Rose. Recorded 1909 by Bob Roberts.
