= African-American musical theater =

African-American musical theater includes late 19th- and early 20th-century musical theater productions by African Americans in New York City and Chicago. Actors from troupes such as the Lafayette Players also crossed over into film. The Pekin Theatre in Chicago was a popular and influential venue. Various theater actors crossed over into African American cinema.

== Early history ==
The African Grove Theatre opened in New York City in 1821. It was subjected to harassment and intimidation, eventually closing.

Before the late 1890s, the image portrayed of African Americans on Broadway was a "secondhand vision of black life created by European-American performers." Stereotyped "coon songs" were popular, and blackface was common. Minstrel shows were often performed in early history and were inspired by black music. These shows were first performed by white people who used blackface in the 1800s. Many of these performers wore old ripped clothing, some stolen from slaves, to "represent" the enslaved African Americans. Along with the clothing, the white performers portrayed black people as lazy, thieves, and dumb.

The Hyers Sisters have been credited with creating the first American musicals in the 1870s. Trained opera singers, they toured the United States for 20 years, performing 'comic operas' that broke with minstrel show stereotypes and told stories about slavery and freedom. Another pioneering Black touring group was Sherman H. Dudley's Smart Set Company, whose musical comedies in the early 1900s bridged the gap between old Minstrel-style stereotypes and more upscale, authentic and self-referential humour.

Will Marion Cook and Bob Cole brought black-written musical comedy to Broadway in 1898. Cook's Clorindy, or The Origin of the Cake Walk, an hour-long sketch that was the first all-black show to play in a prestigious Broadway house, Casino Theatre's Roof Garden. Cole's A Trip to Coontown was the first full-length New York musical comedy written, directed and performed exclusively by blacks. The approach of the two composers were diametrically opposed: Cole believed that African Americans should try to compete with European Americans by proving their ability to act similarly on- and offstage, while Cook thought African Americans should not imitate European Americans but instead create their own style.

Bob Cole and brothers John Rosamond Johnson and James Weldon Johnson focused on elevating the lyrical sophistication of African American songs. Their first collaboration was "Louisiana Lize", a love song written in a new lyrical style that left out the watermelons, razors, and "hot mamas" typical of earlier "coon songs."

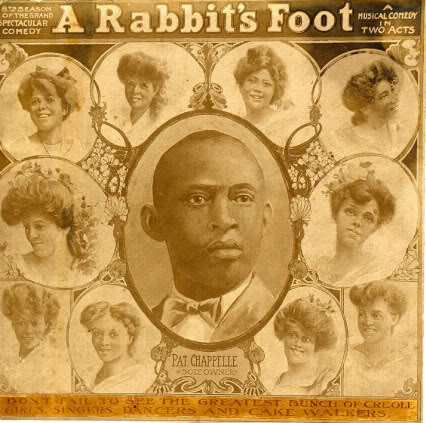
Program from a Pat Chappelle production

Cole and the Johnson brothers went on to create musicals such as The Belle of Bridgeport, The Red Moon (with Joe Jordan), The Shoo-Fly Regiment, In Newport, Humpty Dumpty, and Sally in Our Alley (featuring Bob Cole's "Under The Bamboo Tree"). Bob Cole's suicide in 1911 ended "one of the promising musical comedy teams yet seen on Broadway".

Pat Chappelle was in the theater business and helped organize touring vaudeville shows with numerous performers.

== National recognition ==
Bert Williams and George Walker, called the "Two Real Coons", found fame in 1896 with a musical farce called The Gold Bug. The duo's performance of the cakewalk was successful. Williams met Walker in San Francisco in 1893, while they played Dahomeyans in an exhibit of the California Midwinter International Exposition of 1894. They played different venues while putting together their act.

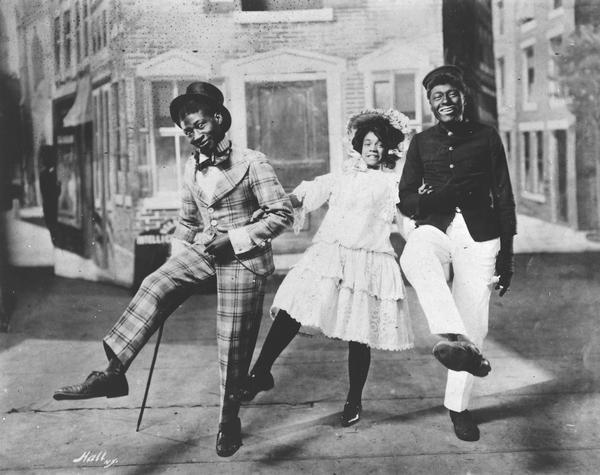
George Walker, Adah Overton Walker and Bert Williams dance the cakewalk in the first Broadway musical written and performed by African Americans, In Dahomey (1903)

Williams and Walker were dropped from "Isham's Octoroons", one of the first African American companies to break from the minstrel style performance. They then put together a number of small productions including A Lucky Coon, Sons of Ham, and The Policy Players, but their ultimate goal was to produce and star in their own Broadway musical. So they thought back to the times in San Francisco and produced In Dahomey (1903) alongside Paul Laurence Dunbar, Jesse A. Shipp, and Will Marion Cook. Abyssinia (1906) and Bandanna Land (1908) were also significant parts of Williams and Walker's claim to fame. Their dreams of stardom come to life and they took musicals in a new direction, back to Africa. George Walker died during the run of Bandanna Land and his wife Ada Overton Walker substituted for him during its final week.

== Crossover shows ==
By 1911, Ernest Hogan, Bob Cole, and George Walker had died. Will Marion Cook and the Johnson brothers, James and J. Rosamond, had pursued new careers and Bert Williams moved to the Ziegfeld Follies and black musical theater went into a hiatus.

In 1915 ragtime composer Scott Joplin attempted to stage his opera Treemonisha in Harlem, but various accounts indicate that any performances given were not well received, and Joplin remained unsuccessful in his attempts to have his full work performed until his death in 1917.

In May 1921, the surprising hit Shuffle Along made its way to New York City with almost $18,000 in debt. "One of the most popular black shows of the 1920s; began to tinker with the pattern of segregation". The creators of the astronomical point in history are The Dixie Duo, Noble Sissle and Eubie Blake, who met at a party in Baltimore, Maryland in 1915. Their career was brief but successful. "Shuffle Along was a milestone in the development of the black musical, and it became the model by which all black musicals were judged until well into the 1930s." F. E. Miller and Aubrey Lyles, who wrote the book for Shuffle Along (1921) had met in 1906, and began performing at the "Pekin Theater Stock Company" near Chicago from 1906 to 1909, along with other African American stars such as Harry Lawrence Freeman.

In 1921, Miller and Lyles appeared in a short film made in Photokinema, a sound-on-disc process, singing their composition "De Ducks", while Sissle and Blake made three films in the Lee De Forest Phonofilm sound-on-film process in 1923. These short films are a record of music similar to the work these four men were doing on stage at the time...

== Rang Tang ==
Rang Tang premiered July 12, 1927, on Broadway at the Royale Theater and ran for 119 performances, including a 14-week overrun, finishing at the Majestic October 24, 1927.

== Lew Leslie's Blackbirds ==
In 1926, white producer and director Lew Leslie staged the first of a popular series of Blackbirds revues with an all-black cast. Leslie mounted a series of Blackbirds revues, which ran in 1926, 1928, 1930, 1933 and 1939. The series were named after Florence Mills theme song, "I'm a Little Blackbird Looking for a Bluebird," a thinly veiled protest against racial injustice, which she first sung in the Dixie to Broadway show in 1924.

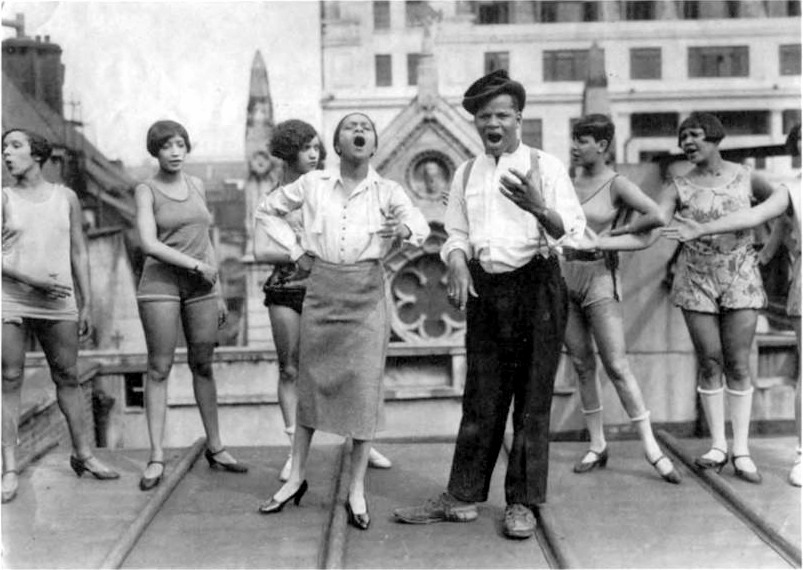
Blackbirds of 1926 – Florence Mills, Johnny Hudgins and chorus girls rehearse on roof of the London Pavilion in September 1926

The Blackbirds of 1926 featured Florence Mills, Edith Wilson and Johnny Hudgins, and had a successful six week run at The Harlem Alhambra in Harlem, New York, before moving overseas to star in the Les Ambassadeurs in Paris, the Casino-Kursaal in Ostend (Belgium) and the London Pavilion. The Blackbirds of 1928, featured such talents as singers Adelaide Hall and Aida Ward, dancer extraordinaire Bill "Bojangles" Robinson and top-flight funnyman Tim Moore. Further Blackbirds revues were staged in 1930 with Ethel Waters, Buck and Bubbles, and Flournoy Miller, in 1933 with Edith Wilson, and in 1939 with Lena Horne and Tim Moore.

The key to Leslie's success was the exceptional talent he found. “Leslie managed to build his black revues around one or more dynamic performers, who could carry a modest show to success.” Although these productions showcased black talent, they were almost completely created by white writers and composers. In an interview, Leslie made a remarkable claim that “They (white men) understand the colored man better than he does himself. Colored composers excel at spirituals, but their other songs are just 'what' (dialect for 'white') songs with Negro words."

== Porgy and Bess, the WPA, The Swing Mikado, and Carmen Jones ==
George Gershwin's Porgy and Bess (1935) – starring Will Marion Cook's wife Abbie Mitchell among many others – is the most famous black musical of the 1930s. It is called a black musical because of the African American cast, even though neither the music or plot is of the “Negro inspiration” like the creators proclaim. "Porgy and Bess marked the nadir in the history of black musical comedy, symbolizing the end of tradition and experimentation in black musical theater on Broadway". This also led the Works Progress Administration to start the Federal Theater Project that established the Negro Unit with programs in 22 cities. This gave a new break to the struggling artists. The Negro Unit avoided musical comedies, but had a few musicals with black cast including Eubie Blake's Swing It, which closed in 1937 and lessened hope for the Federal Theater Project.

However, one black musical comedy succeeded and twisted the new realm of musical theater, The Swing Mikado (1937), a "modernization" of Gilbert and Sullivan’s classic operetta, The Mikado. This was followed by The Hot Mikado (1939). Another modern version of the classics was Oscar Hammerstein II's Broadway musical Carmen Jones (1943), a version of Georges Bizet’s Carmen with an all-black cast.

== Present day ==
In the late 20th and 21st century, predominantly Black musical theatre shows became more common. Notable shows include Once on This Island, The Color Purple, MJ the Musical, Dreamgirls, The Lion King, Tina: The Tina Turner Musical, Ain't Too Proud, Passing Strange, and The Wiz. Sister Act is led by a Black character while Hairspray features multiple Black characters, ensemble members and a story about integration. Michael R. Jackson's A Strange Loop won the Pulitzer Prize for Drama in 2020, becoming the first African American musical to win this award.

== See also ==
- Black Vaudeville
- African American music
- The Frogs (club)

== Sources ==
- Wintz, Cary D.; Finkelman, Paul (2004). Encyclopedia of the Harlem Renaissance. New York: Routledge. ISBN 978-1-135-45536-1.
- Woll, Allen L. (1989). Black Musical Theatre: From Coontown to Dreamgirls. Baton Rouge: Louisiana State University Press. ISBN 0-8071-1469-3.
