= Jim Burris =

James Henry Burris, also known as Jim Burris, (12 October 1876 – 2 June 1923) was an American lyricist, songwriter, actor, dancer, and singer. He had a career as a performer in vaudeville and was a Tin Pan Alley songwriter. He often collaborated with fellow African-American composer and lyricist Chris Smith; including writing the 1913 hit song "Ballin' the Jack". He performed in the Broadway musicals Sons of Ham (1900 & 1901) and His Honor: The Barber (1911); also serving as co-lyricist of the latter show with Smith. More than 50 years after his death, his song "Fifty-Fifty" was interpolated into the Broadway musical Tintypes (1980).

== Biography ==
James Henry Burris was born in Knoxville, Tennessee on 12 October 1876. He was a member of the Golden Gate Quartette in the cast of the original 1900 touring production of the musical Sons of Ham. He was still in the cast when the tour reached the Grand Opera House in Manhattan in 1901. He performed in the Williams and Walker Co. and was also active on the vaudeville stage. In the 1906-1907 season he toured as a member of Gus Hill's Smart Set Company. He married Hattie Cook in Chicago on 9 December 1907.

Burris formed a songwriting partnership with African-American composer and lyricist Chris Smith. They worked for Tin Pan Alley publishing houses in the 1910s. In January 1910 the singing comedy duo Collins & Harlan released a recording of Burris & Smith's song "Slip on your gingham gown" on the Victor Talking Machine Company label. Burris & Smith he co-wrote the lyrics to the song "Constantly" which was performed by the song's composer, Bert Williams, in the Ziegfeld Follies of 1910. Williams recorded this song for Columbia Records in 1910 and it was later recorded by Phil Harris for RCA Victor in 1931.

Burris & Smith co-wrote the lyrics to the musical His Honor: The Barber which ran on Broadway at the Majestic Theatre in 1911 for a two week stop while on national tour. This show began its tour in 1910, and starred Burris in the straight man role of Mose Lewis opposite Sherman H. Dudley as his comic foil, Raspberry Snow.

Burris wrote the lyrics and Smith the music to the hit popular song "Ballin' the Jack" (1913). An early "dance-instruction" song, it was a forerunner to later dance instruction songs like Chubby Checker's "The Twist" (1960). "Ballin' the Jack" was first performed in the 1913 iteration of the Darktown Follies; a musical revue staged in Harlem at the Lafayette Theatre. It was next introduced on Broadway in the Ziegfeld Follies of 1913 and became a rapid hit; setting off a dance craze within White America when music and dance from Black America was becoming increasingly popular in White culture. It was also interpolated into the 1914 Broadway production of The Girl from Utah. It is one of the few dance songs of the era that has had longterm impact; and has been recorded by musicians like Jelly Roll Morton.

In 1916 Burris was a leading cast member of the Darktown Follies; performing alongside Opal Cooper, Alonzo Fenderson, and Alex Rogers. In 1919 he starred in Rogers's touring musical Baby Blues which was mounted by the Quality Amusement Company. His final performances were in the touring company of Eubie Blake's Shuffle Along in the early 1920s. He also performed in two silent films: The Symbol of the Unconquered (1920) and the The Sport of the Gods (1921).

Burris became very ill in early 1923 and was hospitalized at Bellevue Hospital in New York. He died from tuberculosis on 2 June 1923 in Open Hill, Maryland. He died at Sherman H. Dudley's farm located just outside of Washington D.C.. Dudley cared for him in last weeks of his life. Burris & Smith's song "Fifty-Fifty" was interpolated into the 1980 Broadway musical Tintypes.

== Songs ==
- "Slip on Your Gingham Gown" (copyrighted in 1909; published in 1910 by Allan & Co, Melbourne) recorded on cylinder by Collins & Harlan
- "Ballin' the Jack" (1913)
- "Come After Breakfast; Bring 'Long Your Lunch and Leave 'fore Supper Time"
- "All The Little Lovin is Gone Gone Gone"
- "Brighten the Corner Where You Are"
- "Constantly"
- "I’m gone, dat’s all"
