= Alice Gorgas =

Alice Gorgas (1892–1951) was an American singer with a wide soprano range, best known as a theater actress.

== Career ==
Gorgas joined the St. Thomas church choir and became a featured soloist in the choir. She was singing "The Last Words of Christ" when she was heard by a New York performer who told her she needed to go for "bigger" fields, which pushed her to audition for theater. She had to audition many times, but was finally cast at Walnut St. Theater. She started in Baltimore but then moved to New York. This is where her career took off, and she joined the Lafayette Players. She was one of the lead actors in "The Brute". She became nationally known as a singer, and her voice was known everywhere. When Lew Leslie's Blackbirds was being formed, she was asked to be in it as a singing role. After that successful run, she was in the "Shuffle Along" stage production. She was Jennie Summer in the play "In Wyoming". At the end of act three, her friends and the people watching showered her in flowers for her performance.

== Retirement ==
She started to become tired of the stage and spotlight, so she went back to the city to live a quieter life, and started working as a receptionist at a funeral parlor. Her long career took a toll, and she got sick with a heart condition. She had a severe case of pyorrhea, and it spread through her whole system. She had her funeral on a Wednesday, and her body was buried at Mount Lawn Cemetery.
