= Benjamin L. Shook =

Musician

- Born: Benjamin Lothair Shook; Nashville, Tennessee, U.S.
- Origin: Detroit, Michigan, U.S.
- Occupations: Bandleader; singer; composer
- Years active: 1920s
- Education: Fisk University

Benjamin Lothair Shook was an American bandleader, singer, and composer. He and his band, along with the bands of Theodore Finney and Fred S. Stone, "monopolized" Detroit's "entertainment and social world to the almost complete exclusion of white performers ... up into the 1920s."

== Biography ==
He was born in Nashville, Tennessee, to Benjamin M. Shook and Elenora Wharton. His family moved to Cleveland and he was part of the Young Star Quartette there.

He attended Fisk University. The school's catalogue listed him as from Cleveland.

He was a bandleader in Detroit. He succeeded Thomas J. Finney as bandleader of the Finney Quartette. Later in his career, he managed and performed with touring bands and owned a theater.

A song he wrote was featured in the first full-length African-American musical In Dahomey and African Chief.

== Songs ==
- "Dat Gal of Mine"
