= Sons of Ham =

Sons of Ham was a 1900 musical staged in the United States. Will Marion Cook wrote the music and Jesse A. Shipp the book. It was a farce, with Bert Williams and George Walker portraying two young men mistaken for twin heirs. It was their first majorly successful show.

It opened October 15, 1900 at the Star Theatre and closed October 20, 1900 after 8 performances. It also played April 29, 1901 at the Grand Opera House and closed May 4, 1901 after 8 performances. The cast also included Williams' wife, Lottie Williams in the role of Gabby Slaughtry.

Bert Williams and George Walker were photographed performing their characters in the show. The show succeeded their first together, A Lucky Coon. The title of the show, a biblical reference, caused some controversy and protest. Their show In Dahomey followed.

In the fall of 1902, Williams and Walker created a No. 2 company, fronted by Dan Avery and Charles Hart and stage managed by Charles S. Sager. They rehearsed in late September, and went on the road to White Plains, NY (mid-October), Holyoke, Mass (Oct 28), Turners Falls, Mass (Oct 31), Meriden, Conn (Nov 6), Bloomsburg, PA (Nov 27), Washington, DC (Dec 2); Wilmington, Delaware (Dec 10), New Haven, Conn (Dec 22-24), Hartford, Conn (Dec 25). In the new year, the company played Portland, Maine (mid-January), Rochester, NY (end of March), Tampa and St. Petersburg, Florida (mid-April), Washington, DC again (April 29), Reading, PA (May 19-20), Allentown, PA (May 21), Harrisburg, PA (May 22), Pottsville, PA (May 23, and Carlisle, PA (May 25).
