= Lottie Williams =

Lottie Williams may refer to:

- Lottie Williams (actress, born 1866) (1866–1929), American actress
- Lottie Williams (actress, born 1874) (1874–1962), American actress
- Lottie Williams, an Oklahoma resident who is the only person to have been struck by re-entering space debris, when a small piece of the rocket launching the Midcourse Space Experiment harmlessly struck her shoulder in 1997
- Lottie Williams, a victim of a 1980 murder for which Leonard Marvin Laws was executed by the U.S. state of Missouri in 1990
