= Abyssinia (1906 musical) =

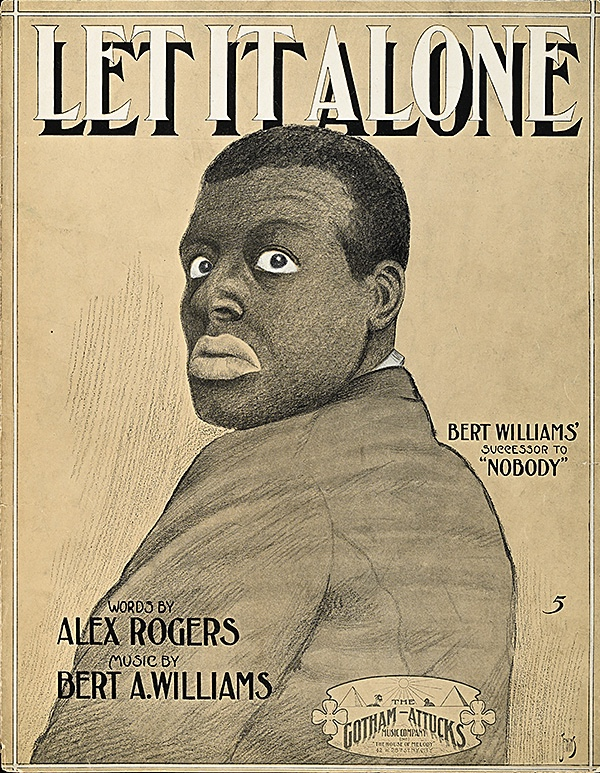
The cover of the sheet music for "Let It Alone" from Abyssinia, published by black-owned Gotham-Attucks Music Publishing Company, showed Bert Williams in stereotypical blackface makeup.

Abyssinia is a musical in one act with music by Will Marion Cook and Bert Williams, and both book and lyrics by Jesse A. Shipp and Alex Rogers. Created by African Americans and featuring African-American entertainers, the work is set in Abyssinia (now referred to as the Ethiopian Empire) and was inspired by the events of the First Italo-Ethiopian War in 1896-1897 and the sustained sovereignty Ethiopia maintained through the leadership of Menelik II at that point in history. The plot of the musical follows two African-American from Kansas who win the lottery and then use their winnings to travel to Europe and Abyssinia. Misadventures ensue when one of them falsely accused of being a thief, and they are brought before King Menelik.

Abyssinia is considered an important historical black musical. It is an early work that consciously departed from the racial stereotypes typically found in other musicals of that period, and emphasized themes of social justice, "black self determination" and "African resistance" while still at its core being a tremendously funny comedy.

== History ==
While referred to in most reference works as a musical, some of the reviewers Abyssinia at the time of the production labeled the work as a "Negro comic opera". Indeed, the score, predominantly orchestrated by Cook, was operatic in significant proportions and utilized conventions of that genre. However, the work also incorporated African-American music like ragtime and cakewalk, and elements of burlesque and popular song; ultimately creating a work of high art that blended genres.

Critical reaction from African-American critics was enthusiastic, particularly in response to the social commentary of the plot, the impressive score by Cook, and the dignity provided to the characters in the absence of the typical racial stereotypes that predominated on the American stage at the time. White critics, however, lamented the absence of these same stereotypes and were highly critical of the work, with many citing that the work was "too white" or relied too much upon the conventions of white comic opera. Ultimately, the reaction from white critics negatively impacted audience attendance at the production had a relatively short run on Broadway.

Abyssinia premiered on Broadway at the Majestic Theatre on February 20, 1906. The production transferred twice during its initial Broadway run, first to the West End Theatre in April 1906 and then the Grand Opera House where it closed in August 1906 after 48 performances. Further performances were given in Washington D.C., Philadelphia, Boston, and Atlantic City. Lavishly produced, the ornate sets were designed by the painter Ernest Albert. In reflecting on the failure of Abyssinia to find a larger audience, critic Sylvester Russell, the first major black arts critic in the United States, stated, "I always contended that 'Abyssinia' was a play of the Negro race and should have succeeded on its progressive merits."

The original cast of Abyssinia included Bert Williams as Jasmine Jenkins, George Walker as Rastus Johnson, Hattie McIntosh as Aunt Callie Parker, Lottie Williams as Miss Primly, and Craig Williams as James.

== Bibliography ==
- Dietz, Dan (2022). "Abyssinia". The Complete Book of 1900s Broadway Musicals. Rowman & Littlefield Publishers. ISBN 9781538168943.
- Forbes, Camille F. (August 2008). Introducing Bert Williams: Burnt Cork, Broadway, and the Story of America's First Black Star. Basic Books. ISBN 9780786722358.
- Hill, Anthony D. (2018). "Abyssinia". Historical Dictionary of African American Theater. Rowman & Littlefield Publishers. ISBN 9781538117293.
- Sampson, Henry T. (2014). Blacks in Blackface: A Sourcebook on Early Black Musical Shows. Scarecrow Press. ISBN 9780810883512.
- Sotiropoulos, Karen (2009). "No Place Like Home: Africa on Stage". Staging Race: Black Performers in Turn of the Century America. Harvard University Press. p. 123-162. ISBN 9780674043879.
- Tafoya, Eddie (2011). Icons of African American Comedy. ABC-CLIO. ISBN 9780313380853.
- Willis, Cheryl M. (2023). Black Tap Dance and Its Women Pioneers. McFarland & Company. ISBN 9781476649160.
