= Ballin' the Jack =

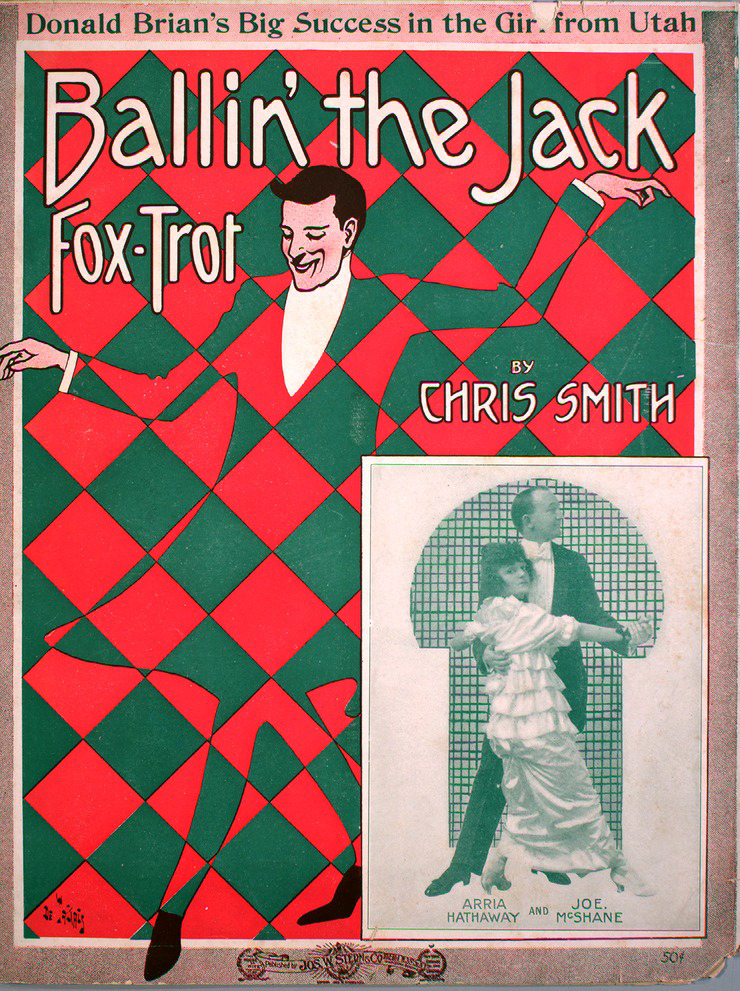
- Sheet music cover, 1913

Song
- Published: 1913
- Composer: Chris Smith
- Lyricist: Jim Burris

"Ballin' the Jack" (or sometimes "Balling the Jack") is a popular song from 1913 written by Jim Burris with music by Chris Smith. It introduced a popular dance of the same name with "Folks in Georgia's 'bout to go insane." It became a ragtime, pop, and traditional jazz standard, and has been recorded hundreds of times.

== Origin ==
Around the same time the song came out, the expression "ballin' the jack" was used by railroad workers to mean "going at full speed." 'The 'Jack' was the slang name for a railroad locomotive, and balling meant going at high speed, itself derived from the ball type of railroad signal in which a high ball meant a clear line. Why this name was chosen for the dance is not clear.

The composer and entertainer Perry Bradford claimed to have seen the dance steps performed around 1909 and they are similar to the shimmy which he claimed has black African connections.

The dance moves were standardized in the Savoy Ballroom, and put to music by Smith and Burris in 1913. The tune became popular in the Ziegfeld Follies of 1913.

== See also ==
- List of pre-1920 jazz standards

== Bibliography ==
- Burris, Jim (w.); Smith, Chris (m.). "Ballin' the Jack" (Sheet Music). New York: Jos. W. Stern & Co. (1913).
