= In Dahomey =

American musical comedy

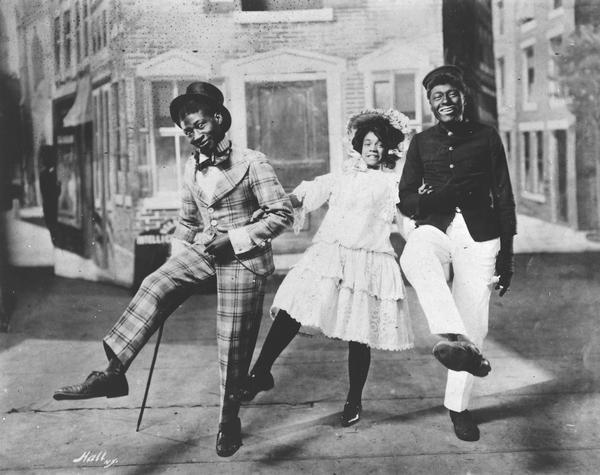
- George Walker, Adah Overton Walker, and Bert Williams dance
- Music: Will Marion Cook
- Lyrics: Paul Laurence Dunbar
- Book: Jesse A. Shipp
- Productions: 1903 Broadway; 1904 New York City

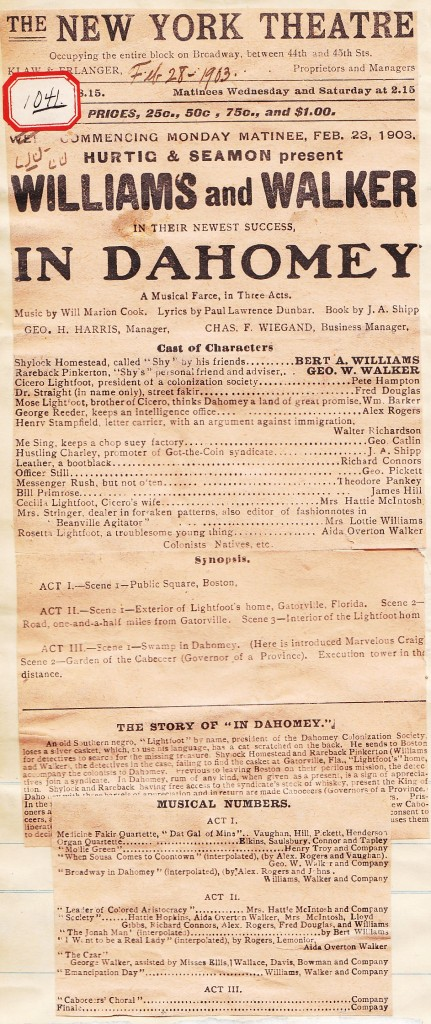
Original program from In Dahomey's debut tour.

In Dahomey: A Negro Musical Comedy is a landmark 1903 American musical comedy described by theatre historian Gerald Bordman as "the first full-length musical written and played by blacks to be performed at a major Broadway house." It features music by Will Marion Cook, book by Jesse A. Shipp, and lyrics by poet Paul Laurence Dunbar. It was written by Jesse A. Shipp as a satire on the American Colonization Society's back-to-Africa movement of the earlier nineteenth century.

In Dahomey is regarded as a marquee turning point for African-American representation in vaudeville theater. It opened on February 18, 1903, at the New York Theatre, starring George Walker and Bert Williams, two iconic figures of vaudeville entertainment at the time. The musical ran for 53 completed performances and had two tours in the United States and one tour of the United Kingdom. In total, In Dahomey ran for a combined four years.

== Production history ==
Produced by McVon Hurtig and Harry Seamon, In Dahomey was the first to star African-American performers George Walker and Bert Williams, two of the leading comedians in America at the time. In Dahomey opened on February 18, 1903, at the New York Theatre, and closed on April 4, 1903 after 53 performances (then considered a successful run).

It had a tour in the United Kingdom, followed by a highly successful tour of the United States, which lasted a total of four years. It was the first American black musical to be performed abroad.

The musical was revived on Broadway, opening at the Grand Opera House on August 27, 1904 and closing on September 10, 1904 after 17 performances. Bert Williams (as Shylock Homestead), George Walker (as Rareback Pinkerton) and Aida Overton Walker (as Rosetta Lightfoot) reprised their roles.

=== Tours in England and America ===
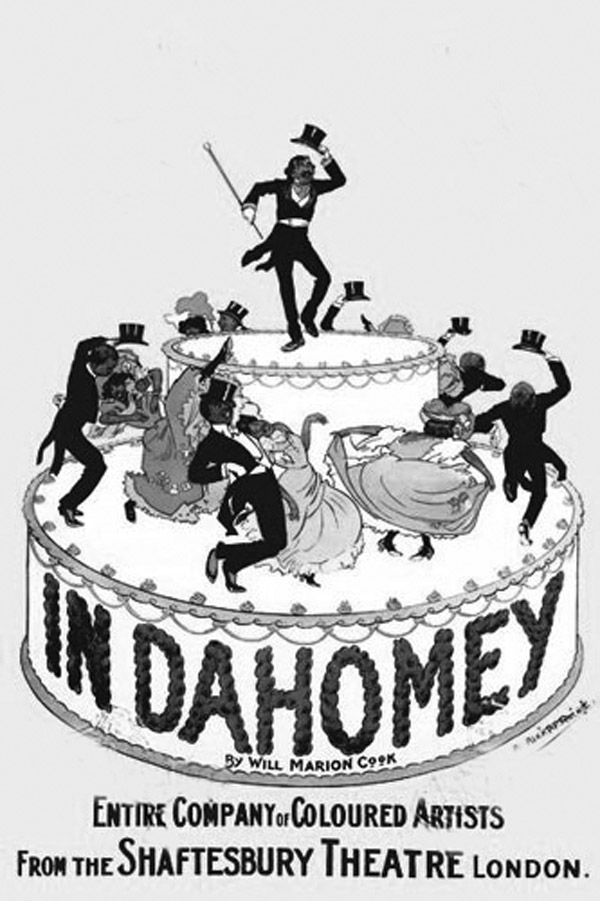
The poster announcing the London premiere of In Dahomey at the Shaftesbury Theatre, 1903. The poster features the famous cake walk with Bert Williams, acclaimed comedian, at the top of the cake.

Based on the show's New York success, the producers of In Dahomey transferred the entire production to England on April 28, 1903, with a staging at the Shaftesbury Theatre, followed by a provincial tour around England. This was capped by a command performance celebrating the ninth birthday of the eldest son of the Prince of Wales at Buckingham Palace. In Dahomey was heralded as "the most popular musical show in London."

After a year touring England and Scotland, In Dahomey returned to New York. It reopened on August 27, 1904, at the Grand Opera House. This was followed by a major 40-week tour across the United States. It played such cities as San Francisco, California; Portland, Oregon; and St. Louis, Missouri; turning in a profit of $64,000.

== Themes ==
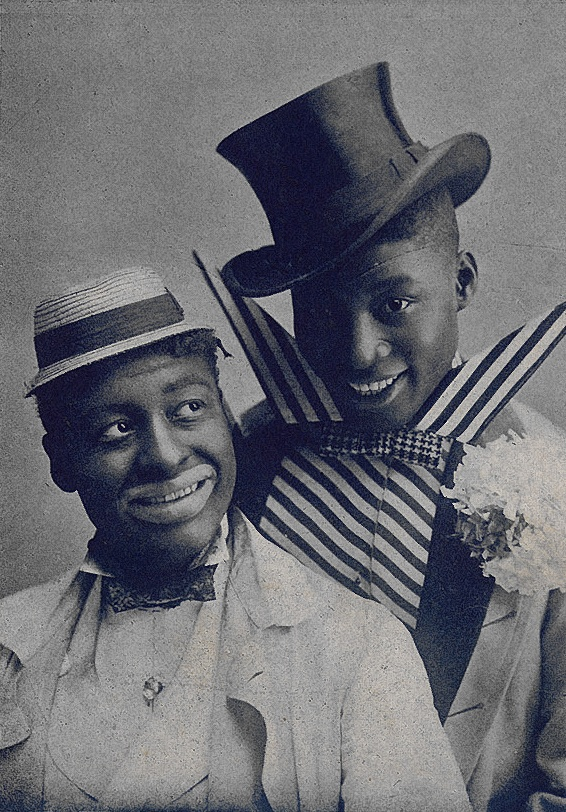
Vaudeville performers Bert Williams (left) and George Walker in blackface and comic outfits.

Featuring the renowned comic pair of Bert Williams and George W. Walker, the show was the first to introduce a critical discourse of African Imperialism into the vaudeville theatre scene. Walker and Williams were said to have emphasized some of the most important components of early 20th-century Black musicals: fast-changing scenery using tableaux (presumably painted backdrops), improvisation, traditional Black-facing, heavy pantomime, and interpolation of songs borrowed from other original source-texts.

== Synopsis ==
The story tells of two conmen from Boston who, having found a pot of gold, devise a plan to move to Africa to colonize Dahomey (present-day Benin) with a group of poor American blacks. Having suffered bad luck, the conmen, Shylock Homestead (played by Bert Williams) and Rareback Pinkerton (George Walker) are sent to Florida to con Cicero Lightfoot (Pete Hampton), the president of a colonization society. To his surprise, Pinkerton learns that Homestead is rich, and arranges to become his trustee to gain access to Homestead's wealth. Once having been successful with that, Pinkerton struts around, acting as a dandy, or a refined figure in black society. Upon realizing Pinkerton's schemes, Homestead refuses to continue to support Pinkerton's acts, and the show culminates with a spectacular cakewalk.

In other sources, In Dahomey is described as following the attempts of two con men (played by Bert Williams and George Walker) charged with recovering a lost heirloom to be flipped for profit. The search for the heirloom crosses paths with a colonization society that intends to settle pioneers in Dahomey. The plot of the original source-text differs, according to many sources, but all agree there were three primary locales in In Dahomey: Boston, Gatorville (Florida), and Dahomey.

A February 1903 New York Theatre program has been found that printed a synopsis that generally concurs with the scenes depicted in extant scripts. The recovered synopsis reads:

An old Southern negro, Lightfoot by name, president of the Dahomey Colonization Society, loses a silver casket, which, to use his language, has a cat scratched on its back. He sends to Boston for detectives to search for the missing treasure. Shylock Homestead and Rareback Pinkerton (Williams and Walker), the detectives in the case, failing to find the casket at Gatorville, Florida, Lightfoot's home, accompany the colonists to Dahomey. Previous to leaving Boston on their perilous mission, the detectives join a syndicate. In Dahomey, rum of any kind, when given as a present, is a sign of appreciation. Shylock and Rareback, having free access to the syndicate's stock of whiskey, present the King of Dahomey with three barrels of appreciation and in return are made Caboceers (Governors of a Province). In the meantime, the colonists, having had a misunderstanding with the King, are made prisoners. Prisoners and criminals are executed on festival days, known in Dahomey as Customs Day. The new Caboceers, after supplying the King with his third barrel of appreciation whiskey), secure his consent to liberate the colonists after which an honor is conferred on Rareback and Shylock, which causes them to decide "There's No Place Like Home."

== Importance ==
In Dahomey marked an important milestone in the evolution of the American musical comedy. Its composer Will Marion Cook combined the "high operetta style" he had studied with the relatively new form of ragtime in the finale "The Czar of Dixie". According to John Graziano, author of Black Theatre USA, it was "the first African American show. The score made use of the "high operetta style" that synthesized successfully the various genres of American musical theatre popular at the beginning of the twentieth century—minstrelsy, vaudeville, comic opera, and musical comedy."

Significantly, the production of In Dahomey marked the first full-length African American musical to be staged in an indoor venue on Broadway, premiering at the New York Theatre on February 18, 1903. The earlier Clorindy was produced in 1898 at the Roof Garden of a Broadway theater. During its four-year tour, In Dahomey proved one of the most successful musical comedies of its era. The show helped make its composer, lyricist, and leading performers household names. In Dahomey was the first black musical to have its score published (albeit in the UK, not the US).

The play is thought to have marked a significant shift in black theatre performance. Limited by a demand for the comedy of ethnic and racial stereotypes— particularly black stereotypes as depicted through minstrel performance— African-American performers were restricted largely to perform variations of the "darky" and Chinese people as caricatures. While still featuring such racial caricatures, In Dahomey simultaneously builds on depictions of black characters. It creates a significant alternative to the dominant representations of blacks in the theatre during its era.

As the first show with an entirely African-American cast, In Dahomey is said to have been met with hostility from some. One New York Times report mentioned "troublemakers" who had warned for the play being the initiation of a potential race war, stressing in its mostly positive review that "the Negroes were in heaven". The play ran for the whole season with considerable success and without incidents. After 59 performances, the troupe was invited to play in London for six weeks, touring England and France for a couple of months after that.

== Music ==
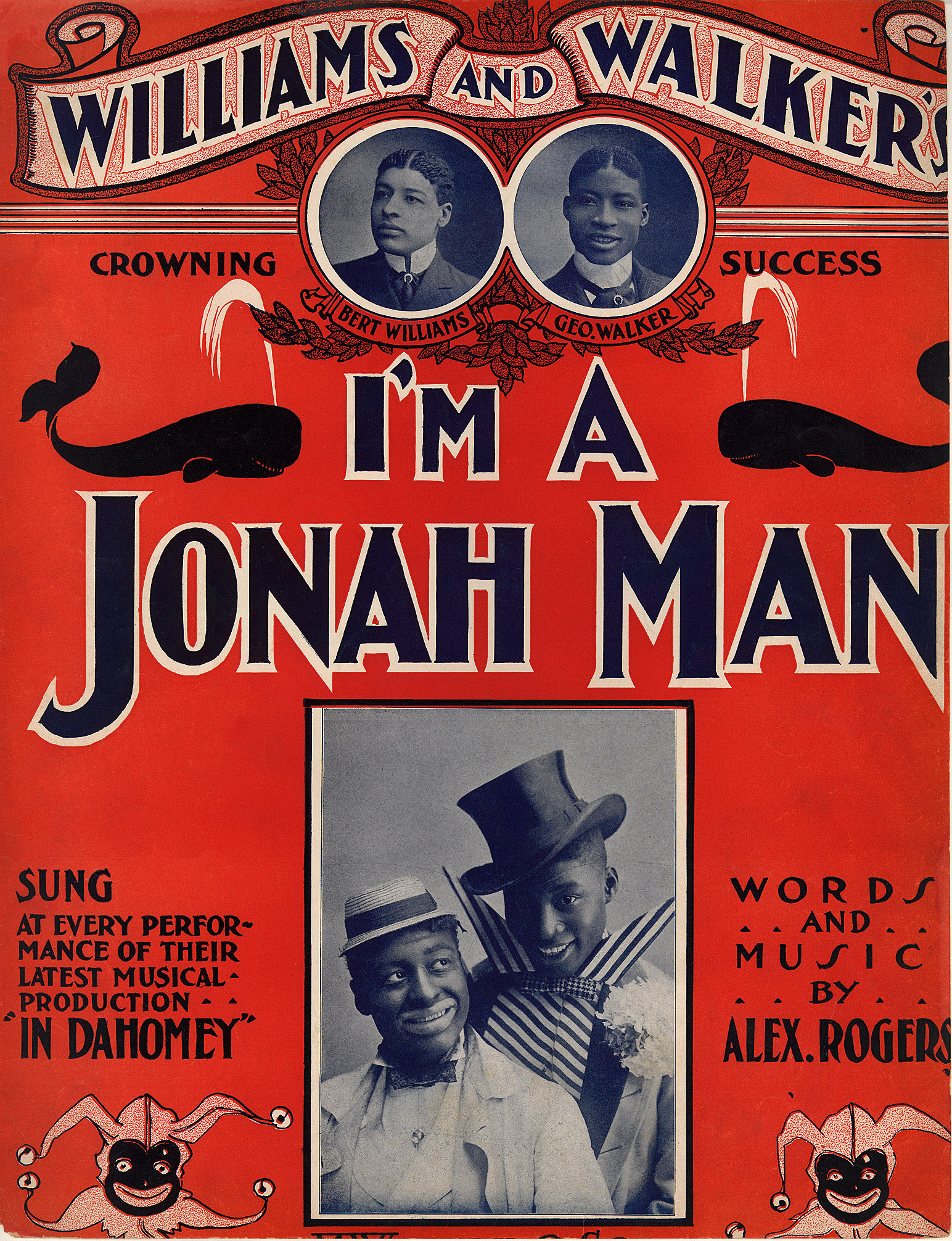
Sheet music cover for "The Jonah Man"

In Dahomey captures much of the perspective of early 20th-century Broadway. Many songs feature classic vaudevillian elements and dramatic flexibility. Fewer than a half-dozen songs were topically linear to In Dahomey's driving narrative. Only two songs, "My Dahomian Queen" and "On Broadway in Dahomey Bye and Bye", refer to the locations and plot integration. Many songs, such as "Brown-Skin Baby Mine", "My Castle on the Nile", "Evah Dahkey Is a King", "When It's All Goin' Out and Nothin' Comin In", and "Good Evenin'", have been performed in other vaudevillian Broadway shows.

=== Musical numbers ===
Title	Music and lyrics	Performer
"Dat Gal of Mine"	Benjamin L. Shook	Male Quartet
"Organ Quartette"	Unknown	Colonist
"Molly Green"	Will Marion Cook, Cecil Mack	Company
"When Sousa Comes to Coontown"	James Vaughn, Tom Lemonier, Alex Rogers	Rareback Pinkerton, Company
"(On) Broadway in Dahomey (Bye and Bye)	Al Johns, Alex Rogers	Shylock, Rareback Pinkerton, Company
"Leader of the Colored Aristocracy"	James Weldon Johnson	Cecillia, Company
"Society"	Will Marion Cook, Will Accooe	Chorus
"The Jonah Man"	Alex Rogers	Shylock
"I Want To Be A Real Lady"	Tom Lemonier, Alex Rogers	Rosetta
"The Czar"	John H. Cook, Will Marion Cook, Alex Rogers	Rareback Pinkerton, Company (female)
"(On) Emancipation Day"	Unknown	Shylock, Rareback Pinkerton, Company
"Caboceers Choral"	Unknown	Company
"Finale"	Unknown	Company

== Original cast ==
Characters	Players
Shylock Homestead, called "Shy" by his friends	Bert A. Williams
Rareback Pinkerton, "Shy's" personal friend and advisor	George W. Walker
Cicero Lightfoot, president of the colonization society	Pete Hampton
Dr. Straight (in name only), street fakir	Fred Douglas
Mose Lightfoot, brother of Cicero	Pete Hampton
George Reeder, keeps an intelligence office	Alex Rogers
Henry Stampfield, letter carrier	Walter Richardson
Me Sing, keeps a chop suey factory	Geo Catlin
Hustling Charley, promoter of Got-the-Coin syndicate	J.A. Shipp
Mrs Stringer, dealer in forsaken patterns; also editor of fashion notes in Beanville Agitator	Lottie Williams

In its entirety, In Dahomey featured plenty more secondary characters than its opening stage at the Harry de Jur theatre could comfortably hold.

== Later works ==
Walker and Williams produced two more musicals featuring them as the stars, known by the full titles as Williams and Walker in Abyssinia and Walker and Williams in Bandanna Land (1907). These works had different themes, staging and locales.

== Cultural references ==
Percy Grainger wrote a virtuosic concert rag entitled In Dahomey (Cakewalk Smasher), in which he blended tunes from Cook's show and Arthur Pryor's popular cakewalk number, "A Coon Band Contest". In this tribute to contemporary African-American music, the clash of the two tunes creates what has been called "a page of almost Ivesian dissonance". Grainger may have seen Cook's In Dahomey on stage in London in 1903. He started composing his rag that year, completing the score six years later in 1909.

=== Song from Show Boat ===
In 1894 the comedian Bert Williams was hired to play an African "native" at the California Midwinter International Exposition of 1894. The Dahomey natives who had been in the 1893 Chicago World's Fair were late reaching San Francisco, where they were again supposed to occupy the African pavilion.

Having learned of the use of African and other foreign people in exhibits at the fairs, Jerome Kern and Oscar Hammerstein II wrote a song, "In Dahomey", for their 1927 musical, Show Boat. Intended as the last number in Act II, Scene I, "In Dahomey" is performed by a purported group of African natives featured in an exhibit at the 1893 Chicago World's Fair. The song begins with the "natives" chanting in what is supposedly an African language. After the watching crowd disperses, they switch to singing in an American dialect, revealing they are American blacks playing roles, not Dahomey natives. The lyrics expressed the relief of the "natives" that they could soon go home to their New York apartments. This scene earlier features the "Act II Opening (Sports of Gay Chicago)" and the hit love song "Why Do I Love You?"

The song was never a hit. After the 1946 revival of Show Boat on Broadway, the song "In Dahomey" was omitted from the score of Show Boat and from the cast album recorded of that Broadway production. It has never been used in a film version of the show. It is one of the few songs having no connection to the musical's storyline.

The song was recorded three times as part of the full musical: in 1928 by the original chorus who performed in the first London production of the show; in 1988 by the Ambrosian Chorus with John McGlinn conducting, who included it in his landmark 1988 EMI recording of the complete score of Show Boat; and in 1993 for the Studio Cast recording of the 1946 revival version.

=== 1999 revival ===
A revival of In Dahomey, of title and songs only, was produced at the Henry Street Settlement from June 23-July 25, 1999 in New York City. It was written and directed by Shauneille Perry, who created a new script inspired by characters and songs from the original.

== See also ==
- List of African American firsts
- African American musical theater
- "1903 in Harlem culture", Univ. of Michigan
