= Metropolis Theatre (Bronx) =

Former theater in the Bronx, New York

Coordinates: 40°48.77′0″N 73°55.43′0″W

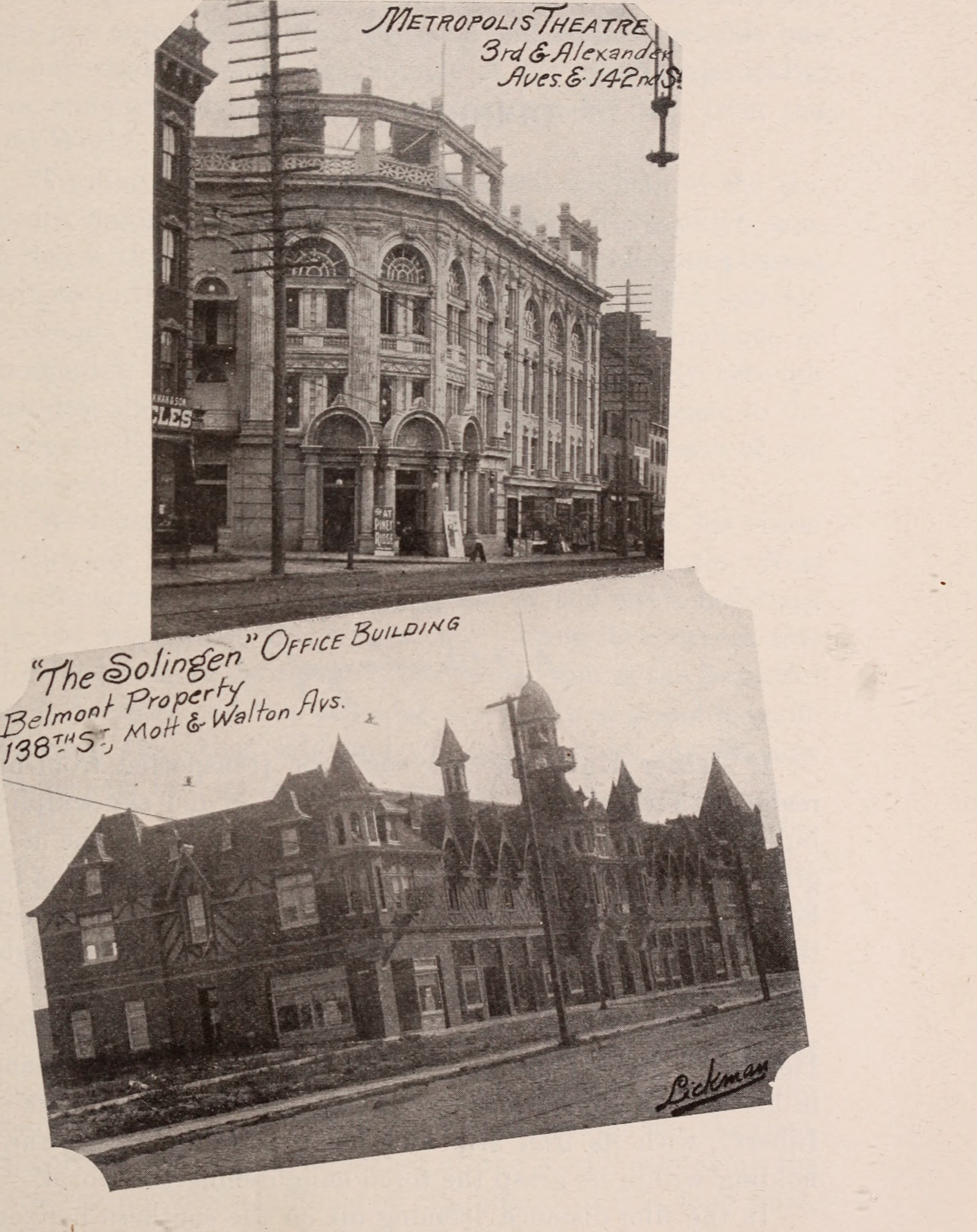
Metropolis Theatre, and an office building

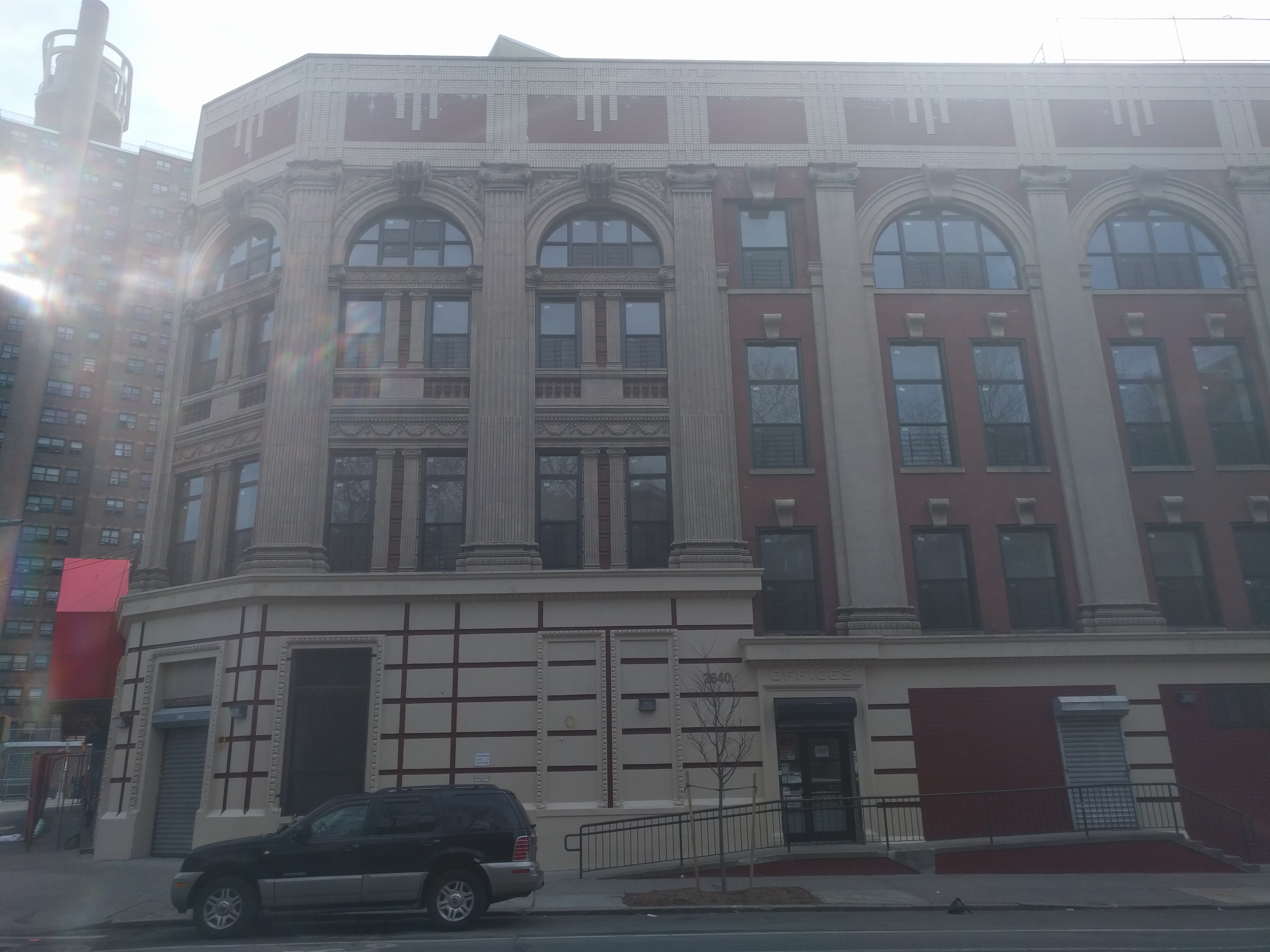
2019

Metropolis Theatre opened as a theater with 1,600 seats in 1893. It was converted to show motion pictures by 1914 as competition from the Bronx Opera House (1913) took hold. It was in the southwest of the area known as the Hub.

The Spirit of the Times reported on the new theater, the only one above 125th Street in an area made newly accessible by elevated, cable, and trolley cars, in its September 4, 1897 issue noting it was managed by Mortimer Theiss with a Klaw & Erlanger company performing In Gay New York The theatre was decorated in "very rich and very artistic" green, gold, and pink. It had a proscenium arch adorned with a picture "of" Giovanni a depicting "a group of maids and lads dancing to sylvan pipes and capturing kisses". The image was said to have exhibited at the Paris Salon.

According to John McNamara, performers at the theater included Francis X. Bushman, Leo Dietrichstein, Clara Kimball Young and Pat Rooney. He wrote that the theatre basement was a Rathskeller while on top of the building there was a roof garden.

Robert W. Snyder's The Voice of the City: Vaudeville and Popular Culture in New York gives a brief history of the Metropolis on page 94, stating that Loew's never operated the Metropolis as a theater and previous owners hosted vaudeville, films, Italian stage shows, and finally burlesque (precipitating a shut down by the police in 1926).

The Metropolis closed in 1926 and Loews used it for storage of the chains scenery, curtains, and draperies used in vaudeville and stage shows (until they were phased out) as well as for a shop that produced the signs and posters displayed at the chain's theaters. It was mostly demolished in the 1940s, leaving behind only facade. It was located at the corner of Third Avenue and 142nd Street.
