= International Theatre =

Former theatre in Manhattan, New York

Coordinates: 40.76674°N 73.98155°W

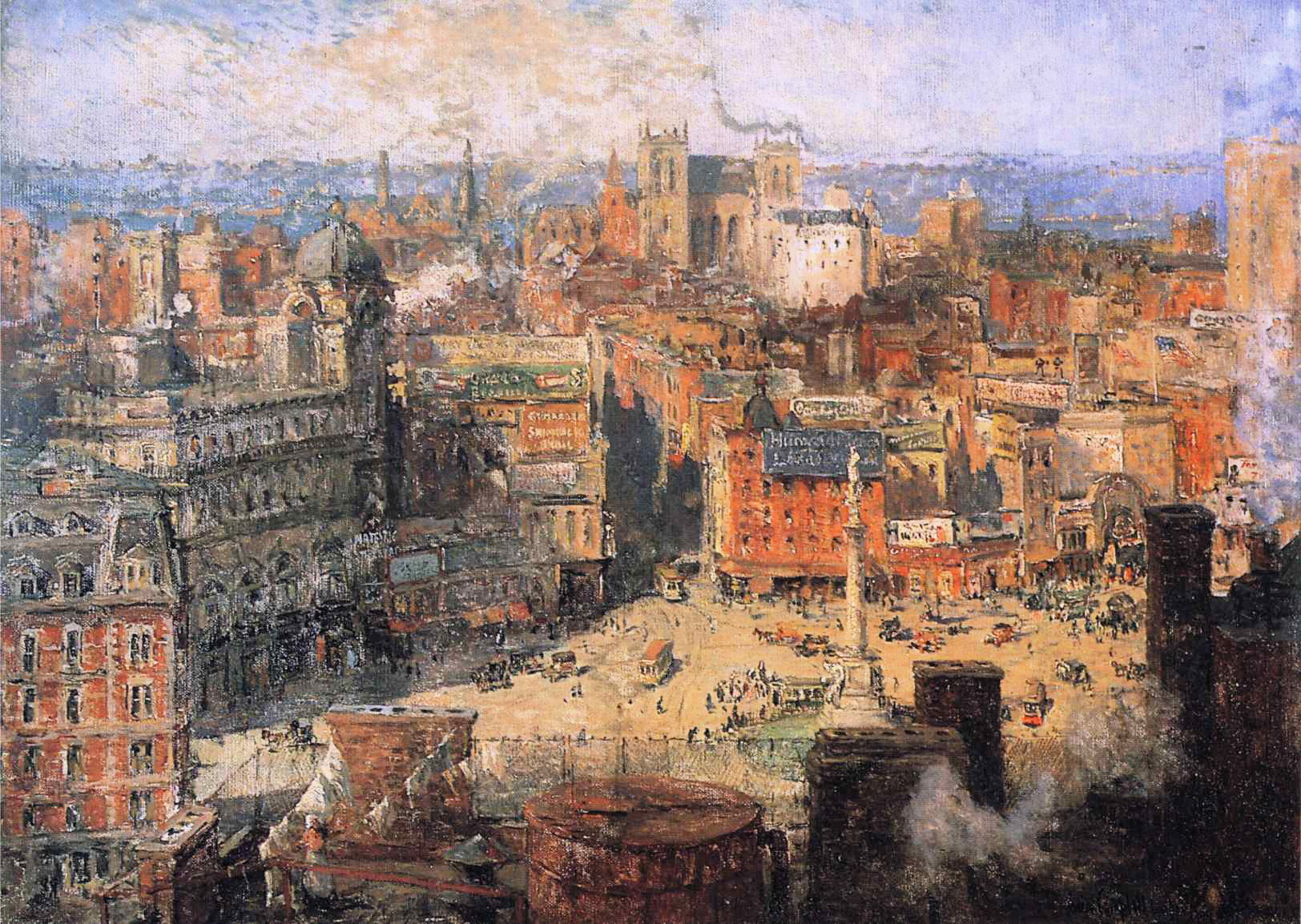
- The then-Majestic Theatre is the large grey building on the left. 'Columbus Circle' (1909), by Colin Campbell Cooper.

General information
- Location: Manhattan, New York City
- Opened: 1903
- Demolished: 1954

Design and construction
- Architect: John H. Duncan

The International Theatre was a theatre located at 5 Columbus Circle, the present site of the Deutsche Bank Center in Manhattan, New York City.

== History ==
The theatre was built by E. D. Stair and A. L. Wilbur. Designed in 1903 by John H. Duncan, the architect of Grant's Tomb, it was built at a time that Columbus Circle was expected to become a theatre district. Initially named the Majestic Theatre, the venue seated about 1,355 and hosted original musicals and operettas, including The Wizard of Oz and Babes in Toyland, and some plays. In 1906 it housed the seminal African-American musical Abyssinia. It was renamed Park Theatre in 1911, opening with The Quaker Girl, and it again presented plays, musicals, and operettas. In early 1913 it showed the world's first full-length color drama feature film, The Miracle. The Shuberts, Florenz Ziegfeld, and Billy Minsky, in succession, owned the house but did not find success there.

In 1923, it was purchased by William Randolph Hearst, renamed the Cosmopolitan Theatre, and played movies. The name was changed to the International Theatre in 1944.

In 1949, NBC leased the theatre, and made it into a television studio rechristened as NBC International Theatre, with the Admiral Broadway Revue being one of the first TV shows aired from this location. In 1953, the venue hosted a portion of the 25th Academy Awards, which was the first Academy Awards to be broadcast, as well as the first to be aired from both New York City and Los Angeles.

The theater was demolished in 1954 to allow for wider sidewalks in front of the New York Coliseum, which in turn was torn down to make way for the Time Warner Center in 2000.

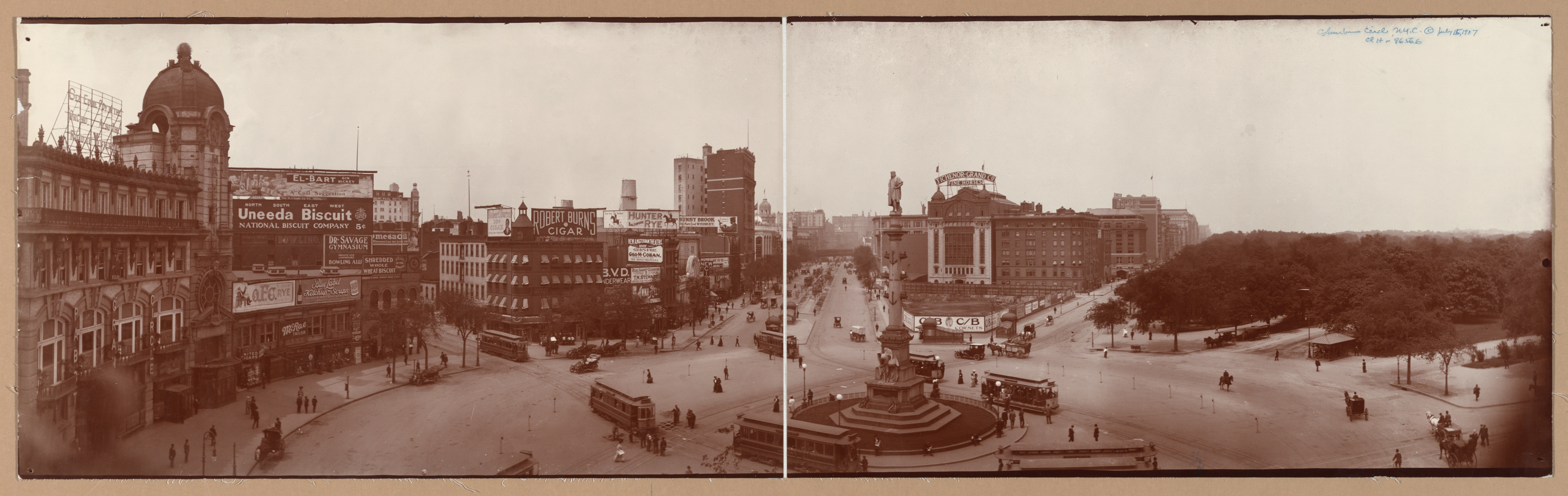
Columbus Circle looking north c. 1907, with the theatre on the left.
