= How to Tell a Story and Other Essays =

Essay collection by Mark Twain

First edition (publ. Harper & Brothers)

How to Tell a Story and Other Essays (March 9, 1897) is a series of essays by Mark Twain. All except one of the essays were published previously in magazines. The essays included are the following:

- How to Tell a Story (originally published October 3, 1895).
- In Defence of Harriet Shelley (August 1894).
- Fenimore Cooper's Literary Offences (July 1895).
- Travelling with a Reformer (16 December 1893).
- Private History of the "Jumping Frog" Story (April 1894).
- Mental Telegraphy Again (September 1895).
- What Paul Bourget Thinks of Us (January 1895).
- A Little Note to M. Paul Bourget (first published in this book).
