= Fred S. Stone =

African-Canadian ragtime music composer

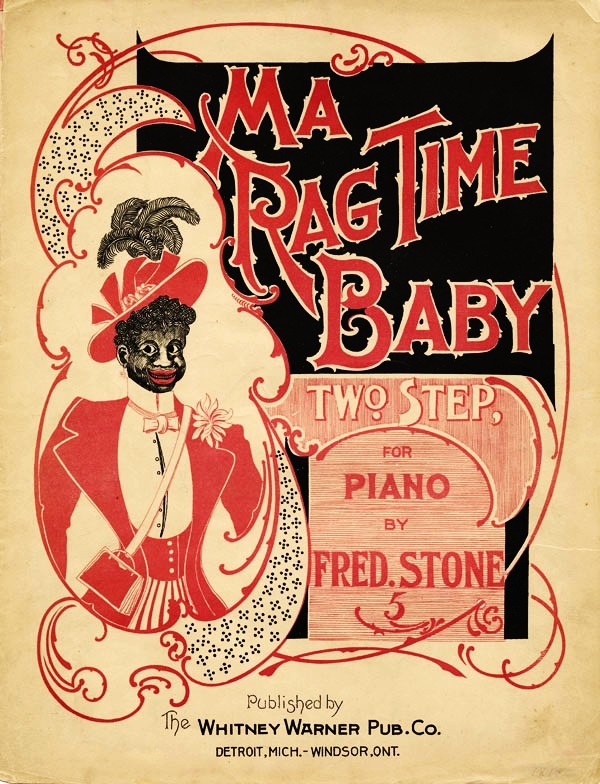
Ma Ragtime Baby (1898)

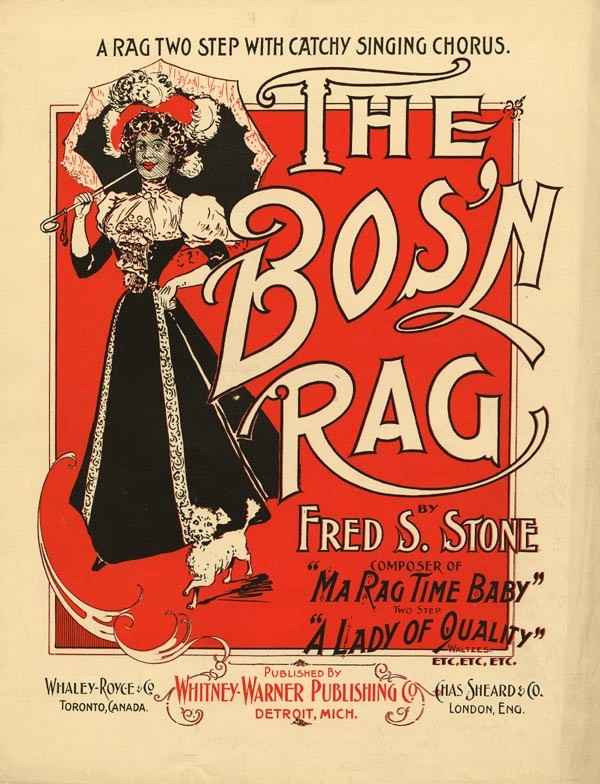
The Bos'n Rag (1899)

Frederick St. Clair Stone (fr) (January 22, 1873 – January 14, 1912) was an African-Canadian ragtime music composer, born in Chatham, Kent County, Ontario.

== Works ==
(sources:)

- 1891 - The Detroit Wheelman's March
- 1894 - At Twilight (Des Aberds) Waltzes
- 1895 - The Indian: Two Step. Central Music Publishing, 1895.
- 1896 - La Albaceté: Spanish Waltzes. Detroit, MI: Detroit Music Co, 1896.
- 1896 - Mackinac March: Two Step. Detroit, MI: Detroit Music Co, 1896.
- 1898 - The Cardinal March. New York, NY: Marquette Pub Co, 1898.
- 1898 - A Lady of Quality: Waltzes. Detroit, MI: Whitney Warner Pub Co, 1898.
- 1898 - Ma Rag Time Baby: Two-Step. Detroit, MI: Whitney Warner Pub Co, 1898.
- 1899 - The Bos'n Rag: Cake Walk. Detroit, MI: Whitney Warner Pub Co, 1899.
- 1899 - Ma Rag Time Baby - Song
- 1900 - Elseeta
- 1901 - Silk and Rags: Waltzes. Detroit, MI: Whitney Warner Pub Co, 1901.
- 1902 - Sue: March and Two-Step. Detroit, MI: Whitney Warner Pub Co, 1902.
- 1903 - Belle of the Philippines: March-Two Step. Detroit, MI: Whitney Warner Pub Co, 1903.
- 1903 - A Kangaroo Hop. Detroit, MI: Whitney Warner Pub Co, 1903.
- 1905 - Belinda: March Two Step. New York, NY: Jerome H Remick, 1905.
- 1906 - Melody at Twilight. New York, NY: Jerome Remick & Co, 1906.
- 1908 - Stone's Barn Dance. New York, NY: Jerome H Remick, 1908.

== Sheet Music ==
- Fred S. Stone, 1899, "The Bos'n Rag" Charles H. Templeton, Sr. sheet music collection. Special Collections, Mississippi State University Libraries

- https://catalog.hathitrust.org/Record/102350221

- Fred S. Stone, 1902, "Sue"

- Fred S. Stone, 1902, "Sue" Charles H. Templeton, Sr. sheet music collection. Special Collections, Mississippi State University Libraries
- Fred S. Stone, 1902, "Sue" Charles H. Templeton, Sr. sheet music collection. Special Collections, Mississippi State University Libraries via CORE (research service)
- Fred S. Stone (1902) "Sue" (Sheet Music) with ad for Whitney Warner Collection of Mandolin and Guitar Music by Samuel Siegel
- Sue (Stone, Fred S.) at International Music Score Library Project
