= Cakewalk =

Type of dance

- Five dancers perform a cakewalk, 1903
- Stylistic origins: African-American music; Jig; Reel
- Cultural origins: Southern United States
- Derivative forms: Ragtime

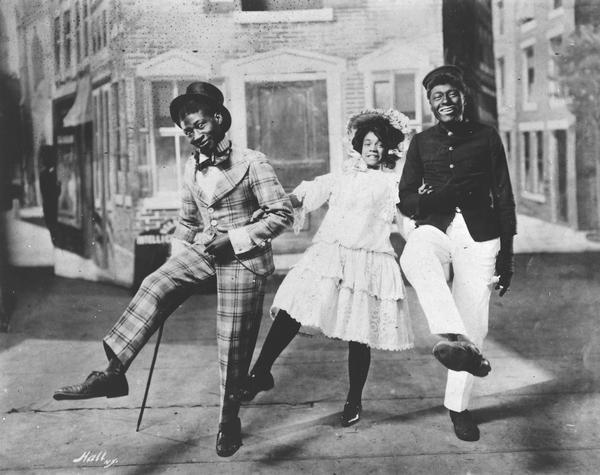
George Walker, Aida Overton Walker, and Bert Williams link arms and dance the cakewalk in the first Broadway musical to be written and performed by African Americans, In Dahomey.

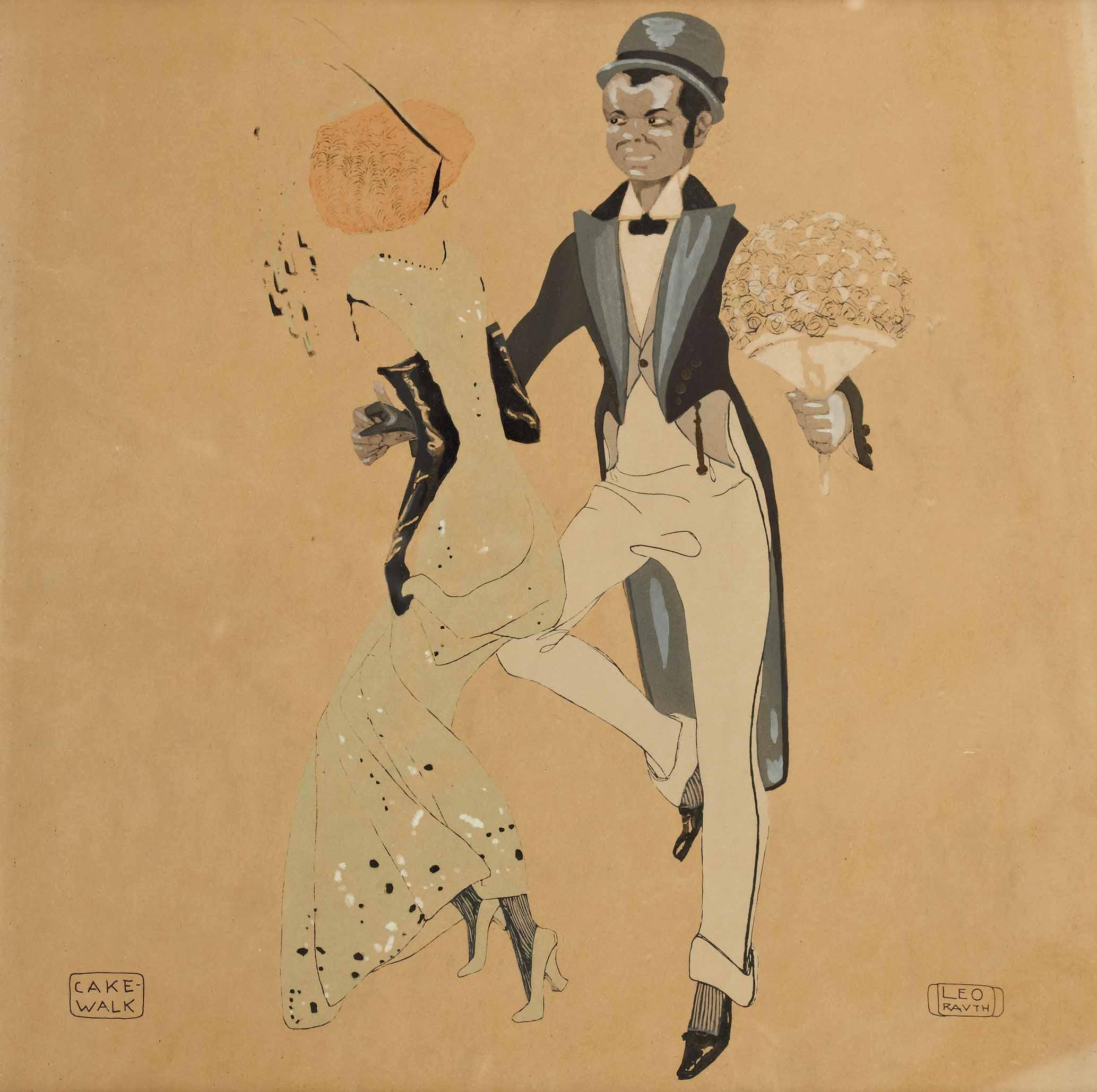
Painting from 1913

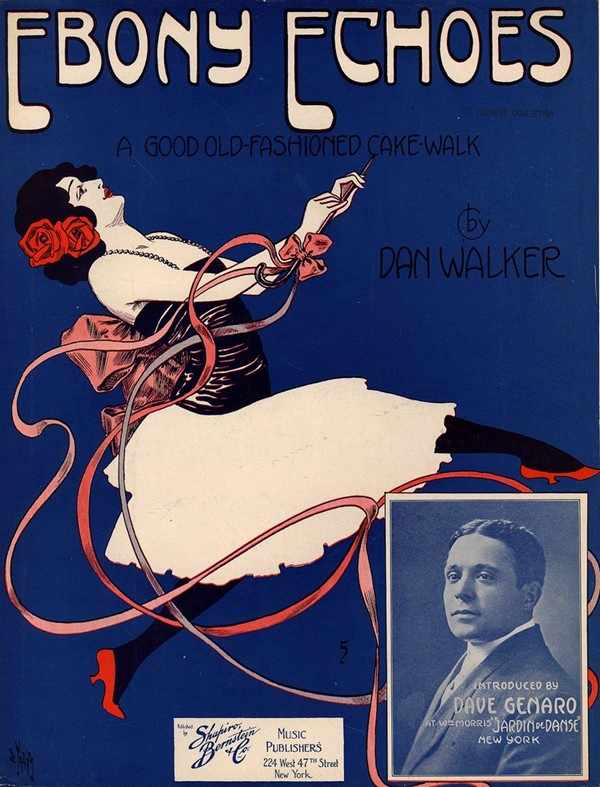
1915 sheet music cover (late for cakewalk music): "Ebony Echoes: A Good Old-Fashioned Cake-Walk" by Dan Walker. New York, NY: Shapiro, Bernstein & Co.

The cakewalk was a dance developed from the "prize walks" (dance contests with a cake awarded as the prize) held in the mid-19th century, generally at get-togethers of African Americans on plantations before and after emancipation in the Southern United States. Alternative names for the original form of the dance were chalkline-walk, and the walk-around. It was originally a processional partner dance performed with comical formality.

Following an exhibition of the cakewalk at the 1876 Centennial Exposition in Philadelphia, the cakewalk was adopted by performers in minstrel shows, where it was danced exclusively by men until the 1890s. At that point, Broadway shows featuring women began to include cakewalks, and grotesque dances became very popular across the country. The fluid and graceful steps of the dance may have given rise to the colloquialism that something accomplished with ease is a "cakewalk".

The National Museum of American History points to the Grand March, a European style couples dance as the inspiration, noting that movements were creatively personalized with the inclusion of twists, shuffles and high kicks from African dances. Plantation owners would often welcome the contest and present the prize cake to the winner as a way to still exhibit authority.

The cakewalk is a lively, partnered vernacular jazz dance that features high-stepping kicks, struts, slides, and an erect upper body tilted backward.

== As a plantation dance ==
=== Firsthand accounts ===
The cakewalk was influenced by the ring shout, which survived from the 18th into the 20th century. This dance style was often part of African American enslaved peoples' religious ceremonies and involved shuffling the feet counterclockwise in a circle (ring) formation and reciting spirituals in a call-and-response format with others outside of the ring.

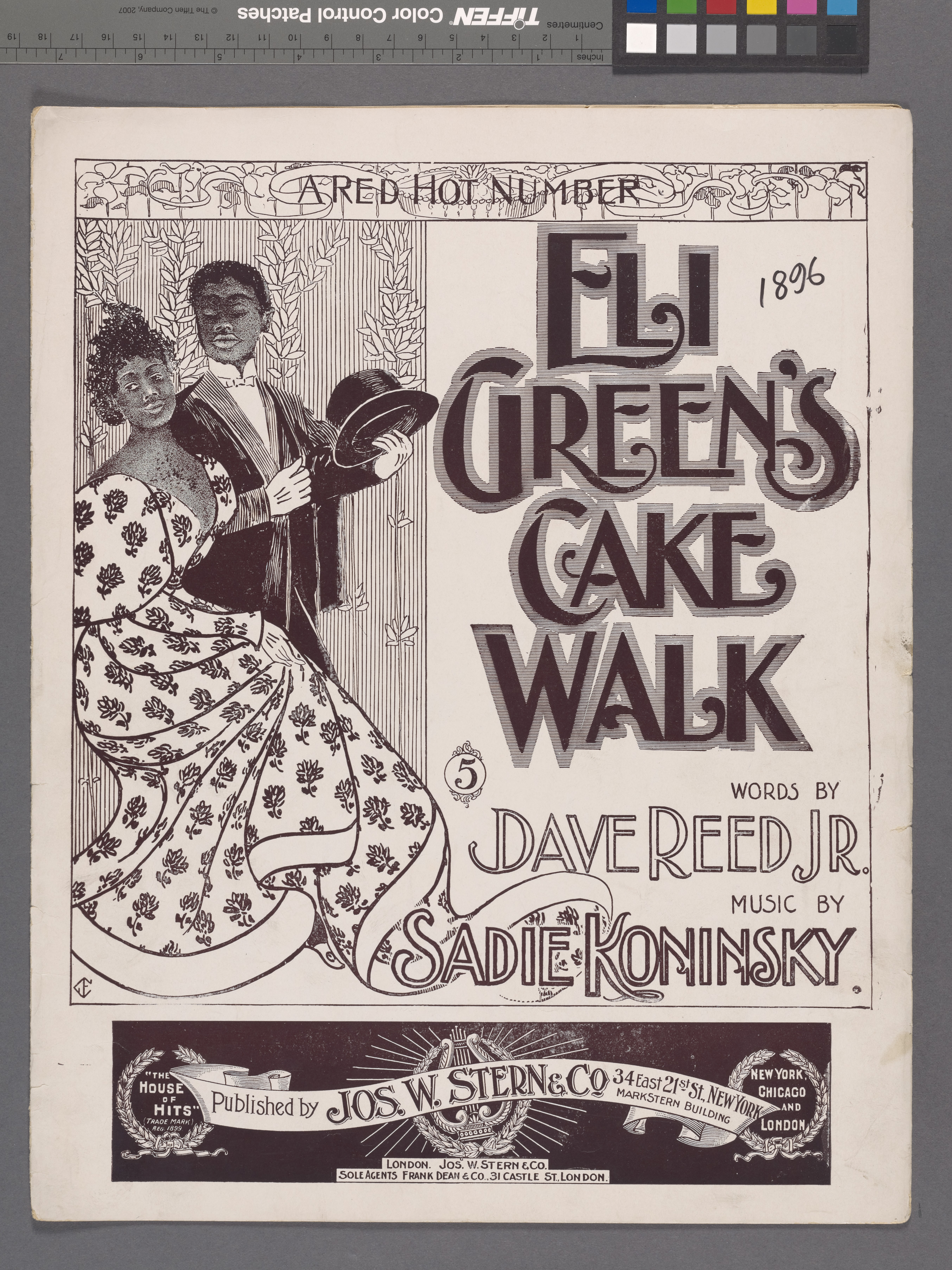
Cakewalk dance, 1896

There is extensive first-person testimony from emancipated enslaved people about the culture and dancing they developed among themselves on the plantations, including the dances that developed into the cakewalk. Louise Jones spoke of "Sech dancin' you never seen before. Slaves would set de flo' in turns, an' do de cakewalk mos' all night." Georgia Baker said that she sang cakewalk songs as a child, and was amused that as an adult, she "would be cakewalkin' to de same song." Estella Jones described nighttime parties with elaborate dress, some of which were attended by the slaveowners, who would judge the dancing and award cakes to the winners.

=== Secondhand, oral-tradition accounts ===
James Weldon Johnson, born in 1871, recounted a cakewalk at a ball in his 1912 novel The Autobiography of an Ex-Colored Man.

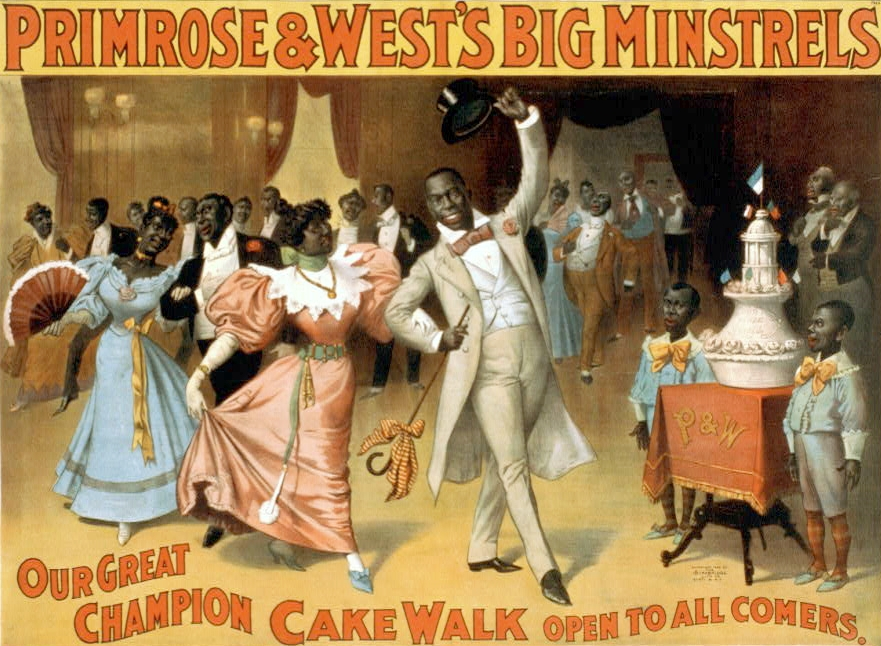
Cakewalk poster, 1896

Some secondhand accounts of the cakewalk describe it as a subtle mockery of the formal, mannered dancing practiced by slaveholding whites. The enslaved people would dress in handed-down finery and comically exaggerate the poised movements of minuets and waltzes. These accounts describe any slaveowners in attendance as unaware that they were being mocked. One man recalled such a dance that his childhood nanny had described to him: "Sometimes the white folks noticed it, but they seemed to like it; I guess they thought we couldn't dance any better." A 1981 article by Brooke Baldwin concludes that the cakewalk was meant "to satirize the competing culture of supposedly 'superior' whites. Slaveholders were able to dismiss its threat in their own minds by considering it as a simple performance which existed for their own pleasure".

Entertainer Tom Fletcher, born in 1873, wrote in 1954 that his grandparents told him about the chalk-line walk/cakewalk as a child, but had no information about its origins. In their version, "there was no prancing, just a straight walk on a path made by turns and so forth, along which the dancers made their way with a pail of water on their heads. The couple that was the most erect and spilled the least water or no water at all was the winner." He describes it being "revived with fancy steps by Charlie Johnson, a clever eccentric dancer" and becoming known as the "Cake Walk".

== Alternative explanations ==
It has been suggested that the cakewalk originated in Florida, with the war dances of the Seminole Tribe. Ethel L. Urlin, writing in the book Dancing, Ancient and Modern (1912), described these dances as consisting of "wild and hilarious jumping and gyrating, alternating with slow processions in which the dancers walked solemnly in couples," which she believed grew into the cakewalk style. The Encyclopedia of Social Dance echoed this, stating that the dance spread from Florida to Georgia, the Carolinas, Virginia, and eventually New York, with the development of Florida into a winter tourist destination in the 1880s.

The authors of Jazz Dance: The Story of American Vernacular Dance reported that an informal experiment with African dancers undertaken in the 1950s turned up "no worthy African counterpart" to the cakewalk. The same book noted eyewitness reports of dances from South Africa, Ghana, and Nigeria that bore a resemblance to the cakewalk, with no elaboration.

In his book How to Tell a Story and Other Essays originally published in 1897, Mark Twain briefly mentions the cakewalk:

Our negroes in America have several ways of entertaining themselves which are not found among the whites anywhere. Among these inventions of theirs is one which is particularly popular with them. It is a competition in elegant deportment. They hire a hall and bank the spectators' seats in rising tiers along the two sides, leaving all the middle stretch of the floor free. A cake is provided as a prize for the winner in the competition, and a bench of experts in deportment is appointed to award it. Sometimes there are as many as fifty contestants, male and female, and five hundred spectators. One at a time the contestants enter, clothed regardless of expense in what each considers the perfection of style and taste, and walk down the vacant central space and back again with that multitude of critical eyes on them (...) The negroes have a name for this grave deportment-tournament; a name taken from the prize contended for. They call it a Cake-Walk.

== Lack of detail/consistency in explanation of the cakewalk's origin ==
It is believed that the satirical nature of the cakewalk led to its being overlooked by archivists. Many of the members of the Federal Writers' Project of the Works Progress Administration who were tasked with recording information about culture of enslaved people assumed that the cakewalk was simply frivolous entertainment. As such, they never asked their interviewees (former enslaved people) to elaborate on the singing and dancing traditions in which enslaved people would participate. This runs in opposition to the researchers' interest in “slave spirituals” and religious practices, where interviewees were often asked to demonstrate examples from those traditions. As Baldwin argues:

The interviewers willingly believed that slaves could express a child-like faith in the white Christian God (whites had not yet guessed at the hidden-revolutionary meanings of spirituals), but they could not conceive of blacks participating in a rich cultural life independent of European forms. Thus they felt no need to press the ex-slaves for further explanations of remarks which hinted that such a culture indeed existed.

It is also likely that as the cakewalk was appropriated into white culture, it lost much connection to its history. Even if white people had once perceived it as a threat, they were able to dismiss that notion "by considering it as a simple performance which existed merely for their own pleasure. To coopt the cakewalk, physically seize control of it, was within the power of whites who ‘owned’ the blacks with whom they lived."

Brooke Baldwin's 1981 article claims that, failing to successfully turn the cakewalk into a white art form, it instead was heavily degraded by white caricaturists. They spun the narrative of the cakewalk as a mediocre emulation of white culture, further clouding its true origins as satire of slaveowner aristocracy: "Cakewalkers were made to appear ludicrous." This idea of the cakewalk became so prevalent that for a long time, the "cakewalk clown" was the mainstream view of the dance and black culture as a whole. It is only recently that researchers have begun correcting that perspective to set the record straight.

== Cakewalk in minstrelsy, musicals, and as a popular dance ==
Amiri Baraka in Blues People explained the strangeness of a “slave dance” covertly mocking white slaveholders that later was adopted by whites unaware of the mockery: "If the cakewalk is a Negro dance caricaturing certain white customs, what is that dance, when, say, a white theater company attempts to satirize it as a Negro dance? I find the idea of white minstrels in blackface satirizing a dance satirizing themselves a remarkable kind of irony—which, I suppose, is the whole point of minstrel shows."

An exhibit at the 1876 Philadelphia Centennial featured Black people singing folk songs and doing an old dance called the "chalk-line walk" in a plantation-like setting. The dance was "done in the original fashion", as described by Fletcher.

In 1877, performer-showmen Harrigan and Hart produced "Walking for Dat Cake, An Exquisite Picture of Negro Life and Customs" as a feature sketch at New York's Theater Comique on lower Broadway.

Thereafter it was performed in minstrel shows, exclusively by men until the 1890s. In the 1893 production of The Creole Show, which ran from 1889 to 1897, Dora Dean and her husband Charles E. Johnson were a hit with their specialty, a cakewalk danced as partners. Their production had an African-American cast, and featured women dancing, which was revolutionary for the time. The inclusion of women "made possible all sorts of improvisations in the Walk, and the original was soon changed into a grotesque dance” that became very popular across the country.

A Grand Cakewalk was held in Madison Square Garden, the largest commercial venue in New York City, on February 17, 1892. The Illustrated London News carried an 1897 report of a cakewalk at a barn dance in Ashtabula, Ohio, written by an English woman traveler. This version was more of a procession and less of a dance: "Just before the ball was declared finished a long procession of couples was formed who walked in their very best manner around the room three times before the criticizing eyes of a dozen old people, who selected the best turned-out pair, and gravely presented them with a large plum cake.

In July 1898, the musical comedy Clorindy, or The Origin of the Cake Walk opened on Broadway in New York. Will Marion Cook wrote ragtime music for the show. Black dancers mingled with white cast members for the first instance of integration on stage in New York. According to Cook, the show was a resounding success: "My chorus sang like Russians, dancing meanwhile like Negroes, and cakewalking like angels, black angels! When the last note was sounded, the audience stood and cheered for at least ten minutes. This was the finale which Witmark had said no one would listen to. It was pandemonium .... But did that audience take offense at my rags and lack of conducting polish? Not so you could notice it!"

"Dusky troopers march & cake walk" was written by Will Hardy and published in 1900.

Scott Joplin mentioned the cake walk in his folk ballet The Ragtime Dance, published in 1902.

Let me see you do the rag-time dance,
Turn left and do the cakewalk prance,
Turn the other way and do the slow drag –
Now take your lady to the World's Fair
And do the rag-time dance.

The French music hall singer and dancer Eugénie Fougère was filmed in 1899 in the rag-time cake-walk "Hello, Ma Baby", with which she made a sensation at the New York Theatre. She is said to have introduced the dance in Paris (France) in 1900 in the Théâtre Marigny after she returned from a tour in the United States. The ambiguous "cake walk" became very popular quickly and for a few months in 1903, Paris was in the grip of a veritable 'cake-walk craze' (folie du cake-walk). Fougère appeared on the October 18, 1903, cover of Paris qui Chante dancing to the song Oh ! ce cake-walk. The lyrics interconnected African and American dance, monkeys and epilepsy – reflecting the racist and colonial attitudes that prevailed at the time.

Performances of the "Cake Walk", including a "Comedy Cake Walk" were filmed by the American Mutoscope and Biograph Company in 1903. Prancing steps were the main steps shown in the "Cake Walk" segment, which featured two couples, and a solo dancer. All dancers were African-American. 1903 was the same year that both the cakewalk and ragtime music arrived in Buenos Aires, Argentina, which may have influenced early styles of tango.

"Cakewalk King" Charles E. Johnson, who, with his wife Dora Dean, achieved fame cakewalking throughout the United States and Europe, described his kind of dance as "simple, dignified and well-dressed".

Fougère dancing the cake-walk c. 1899, filmed by Frederick S. Armitage.

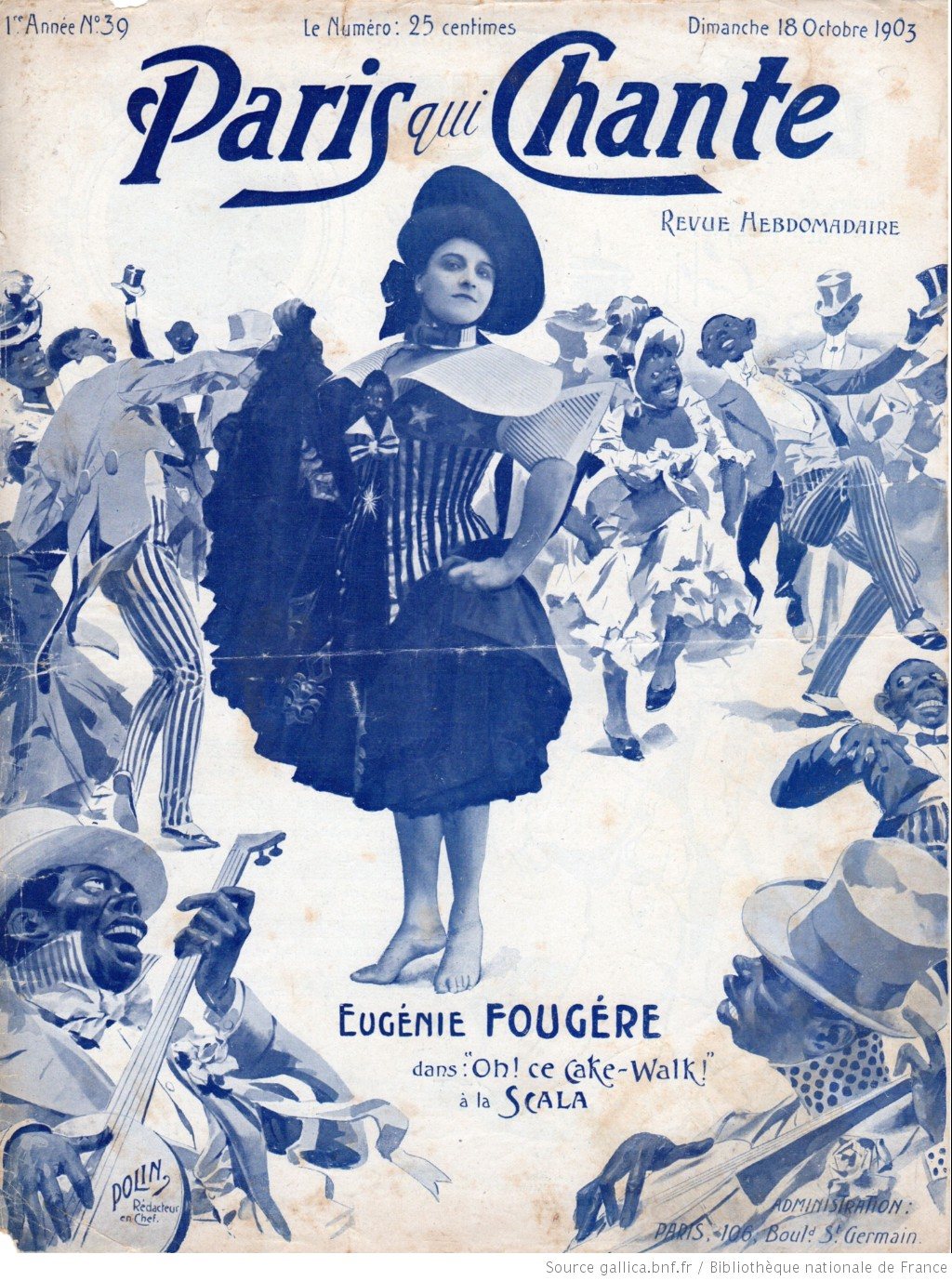
Eugénie Fougère on the 18 October 1903 cover of Paris qui Chante dancing to the song "Oh! ce cake-walk"

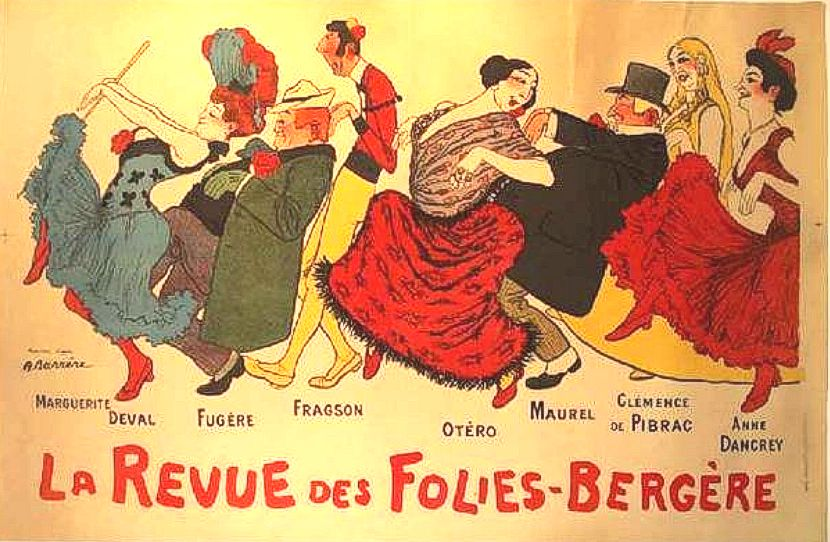
A 1903 poster for the Revue des Folies-Bergère with several parodies of popular French music-hall artists by Adrien Barrère.

== Cakewalk as a musical form ==
The basic habanera rhythm.

Most cakewalk music is notated in 2/4 time signature with two alternate heavy beats per bar, giving it an oompah rhythm. The music was adopted into the works of various composers, including Robert Russell Bennett, John Philip Sousa, Claude Debussy and Louis Moreau Gottschalk. Debussy wrote "Golliwogg's Cake-walk" as the final movement of his Children's Corner suite for piano (published 1908), and The Little Nigar, subtitled A Cakewalk, for a piano method in 1909. The Cake Walk dance originated from the two-step, a dance which was itself spawned by the popularity of Sousa's marches. Although it featured more improvisation than the two-step, it was still very formal compared to later African-American dances such as the Charleston, Black Bottom and Lindy Hop.

Cakewalk music incorporated polyrhythm, syncopation, and the habanera rhythm into the regular march rhythm.

The cakewalk style eventually gave way to the creation of “coon songs”, which used cakewalk music and stereotypical lyrics to create musical caricatures of African American culture. Titles included "Rastus on Parade", "De Darkey Cavaliers", and "Kullud Koons' Kake Walk". These songs were "infectiously popular", and they allowed for African American musical virtuosity to be well-received at the same time as the stereotypes portrayed by the music.

== Modern times ==
The American English term "cakewalk" was used as early as 1863 to indicate something that is very easy or effortless, although this metaphor may refer to the carnival game of the same name in referring to the fact that the latter's winners obtain their prize by doing no more than walking around in a circle. Though the dance itself could be physically demanding, it was generally considered a fun, recreational pastime, covertly mocking slaveholder dance parties. The phrase "takes the cake" also comes from this practice, as could "piece of cake".

One version of the cakewalk is sometimes taught, performed and included in competitions within the Scottish-inspired Highland dance community, especially in the southern United States. In 2021, the Royal Scottish Official Board of Highland Dancing ruled to remove the dance from competition on the basis that it was derogatory to persons of color (despite Black people having invented it).

A version of the cakewalk seen in vintage film clips from the early 1900s is kept alive in the Lindy Hop community through performances by the Hot Shots and through cakewalk classes held in conjunction with Lindy Hop classes and workshops.

Judy Garland and Margaret O'Brien perform a cakewalk in the 1944 MGM musical Meet Me in St. Louis.

== Fairground ride ==
The original cakewalk dance inspired a fairground ride. The ride consists of two sides, customers walk along one side, around the end and back down the other. Each side has a central bridge mounted on cranks which give it an up and down motion as well as to and fro. On each end of the bridge section is a gangway and sliding platform. The British rides were often given an American name such as "Old Tyme Brooklyn Cakewalk" or "American Cakewalk" or variations thereon.

The first cakewalk ride is believed to have been built by Plimson and Taylor in 1895. Traditional cakewalks had an organ attached and on some of them if the organ sped up, the walk also sped up. Cakewalks, or to be precise the "dancing" customers, were considered to be good spectacles, which drew in more potential customers.

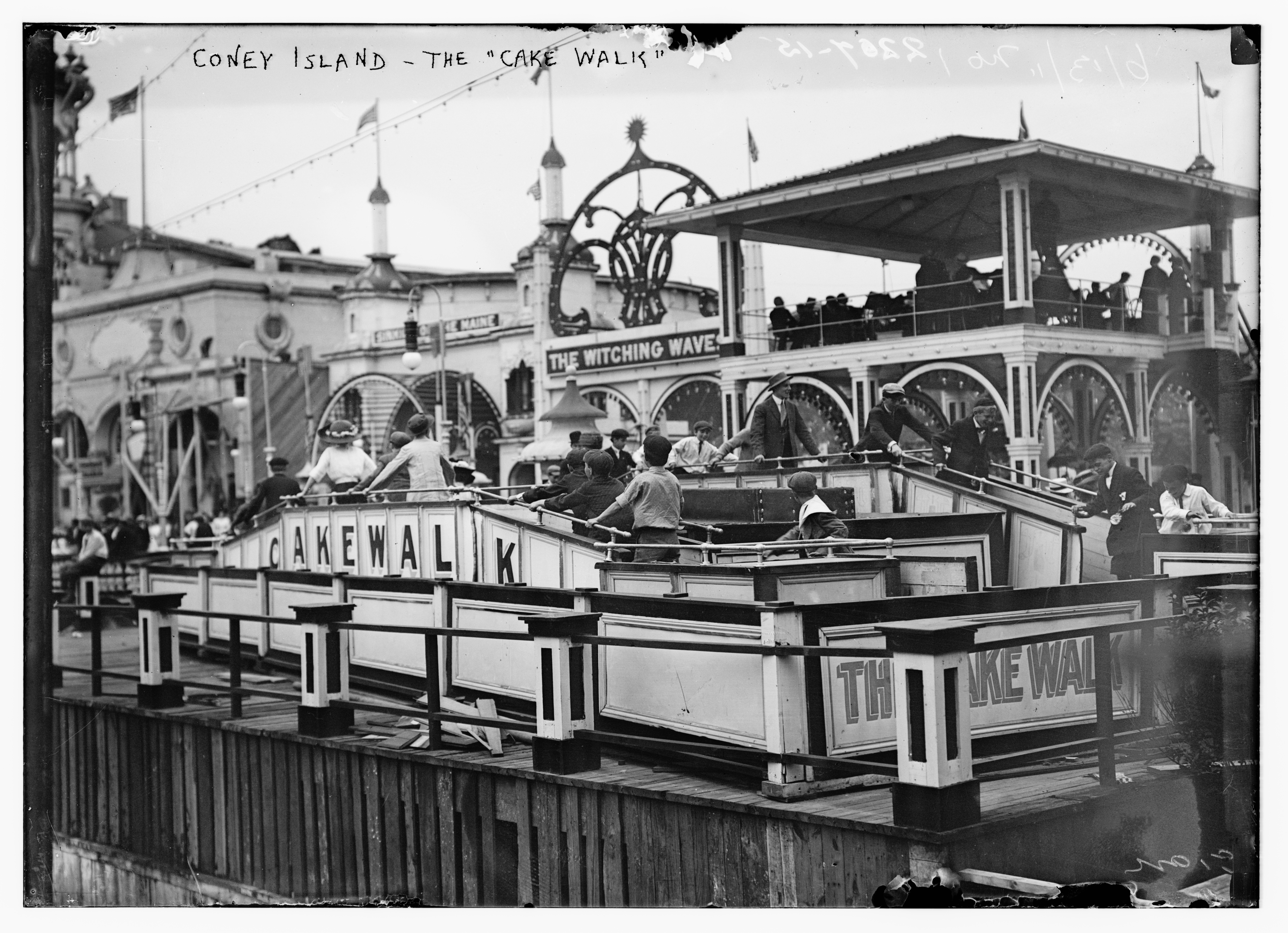
The "Cake Walk" at Coney Island in 1911.
