= Jesse A. Shipp =

American writer (1864–1934)

Jesse A. Shipp, Sr., American playwright.

Jesse Allison Shipp, Sr. (March 24, 1864, in Cincinnati, Ohio – May 1, 1934, in Jamaica, Queens, New York) was an American actor, playwright, and theatrical director, who is best remembered as a pioneer African-American writer of musical theater in the United States, and as the author of the book upon which the landmark play In Dahomey was based. Shipp played an influential role in expanding black theater beyond its minstrel show origins and is recalled as perhaps the first African-American director of a Broadway performance.

== Biography ==
=== Early years ===
Born in 1864 in Cincinnati, his father Thomas Shipp was born about 1821 in the slave state of South Carolina. His mother Ellen Shipp was of biracial heritage, and was born around 1830 in the slave state of Kentucky. Sometime prior to the outbreak of the American Civil War both had managed to leave the Southern United States to live in freedom in Ohio.

Shipp attended public school in Cincinnati, graduating from high school at the age of 16. Upon graduation he immediately entered the work force, working as a retail clerk and driving a laundry wagon. In his free time Shipp got together with three of his peers and formed a musical quartet, which sang evenings in the German section of Cincinnati.

=== Career ===
Shipp joined a minstrel show based in Indianapolis, Indiana, but left after three weeks. In 1887 he took his own quartet on the road, and they remained together for the next seven years, achieving success playing in conjunction with a variety of traveling minstrel companies.

Following the disbanding of his quartet in 1894, Shipp became an actor in the traveling black theater of the day, including roles in such popular performances as Uncle Tom's Cabin from 1894 to 1895, John William Isham's Oriental America in 1896 and 1897, and A Trip to Coon-Town from 1897 to 1899.

Shipp was hired by the vaudeville team of Bert Williams and George Walker in 1900 as a stage manager, writer, and performer for their troupe's productions. A series of plays were written in subsequent years for Williams and Walker including books from which the seminal plays In Dahomey and Abyssinia, works noted for better plot development and character development than had been typical of black theatre in the era. Unfortunately for historians of American black theatre, some of Shipp's original treatments have not been preserved, with the book for In Dahomey surviving only in fragments.

Around 1908 Shipp went to work for Robert T. Motts and his Pekin Stock Company of Chicago. Shipp was hired as the resident playwright for the non-touring company. Shipp authored a number of critically acclaimed plays during this interval, but the demands of his employer for a constant stream of fresh fare forced Shipp to increasingly make use of traditional vaudeville forms. Motts would die in July 1911.

By 1910 the Pekin Stock Company was in decline, wracked by competition from other theatres in Chicago, which had begun to supplement their dramatic performances with the showing of movies. Jesse Shipp took over the operation, renaming it the Jesse Shipp Stock Company, employing Sam Corker as permanent stage manager, and making use of many of the remaining Pekin players. A number of plays were staged by the company in the Pekin Theatre, including several written by Shipp. The Jesse Shipp Stock Company was itself disbanded in 1911, however. In 1913, Shipp produced and directed a performance of Gilbert and Sullivan's Mikado for the Howard Theatre in Washington, D.C. The production featured the well-known contralto, Daisy Tapley singing Katisha and Dr. Charles Sumner Wormley playing the title character.

In 1921 Shipp established the second key African-American dramatic club in New York City's Harlem district, the Dressing Room Club. Located at the Harlem Community House on 7th Avenue, the Dressing Room Club declared as its official goals the impressing of the world with "the dignity and economic value of the Negro element of the profession" and preservation of the history of the Negro in theatricals. Over 250 members of New York's black theatre leaders were members of this organization headed by Shipp, including writers, performers, composers, and musicians.

Ship was intimately involved with the Harlem Productions Company in 1925 and 1926 — a group first organized to produce the musical farce Lucky Sambo. Debuting June 6, 1925, nine performances were staged on Broadway at the Colonial Theatre, with Shipp playing the key supervisory role of stage manager.

=== Death and legacy ===
Jesse A. Shipp, Sr. died on May 1, 1934, in Jamaica Hospital in Jamaica, Queens, New York. He had lived with his wife in Richmond Hill, Queens, New York; he was buried at St. Michael's Cemetery in Astoria, Queens, New York.

Shipp has been lauded as a pioneer in moving black theatre beyond its minstrel origins towards a more fully developed artistic form and is remembered as one of the first, if not the first, African-American director of a Broadway performance.

Shipp's son, Jesse A. Shipp, Jr. (1886-1922), followed his father's footsteps into the world of show business as the founder of the Shipp Association, a dramatic booking agency based in Harlem in New York City.

== Selected plays ==
- Policy Players (1899)
- The Sons of Ham (1900)
- In Dahomey (1902)
- Abyssinia (1905)
- In Bandana Land (1907)
- No Place Like Home (1910)
- A Night in New York's Chinatown (1910)
- Dr. Herb's Prescription, or, It Happened in a Dream (1911)
