= George Walker (vaudeville) =

American actor (c. 1872–1911)

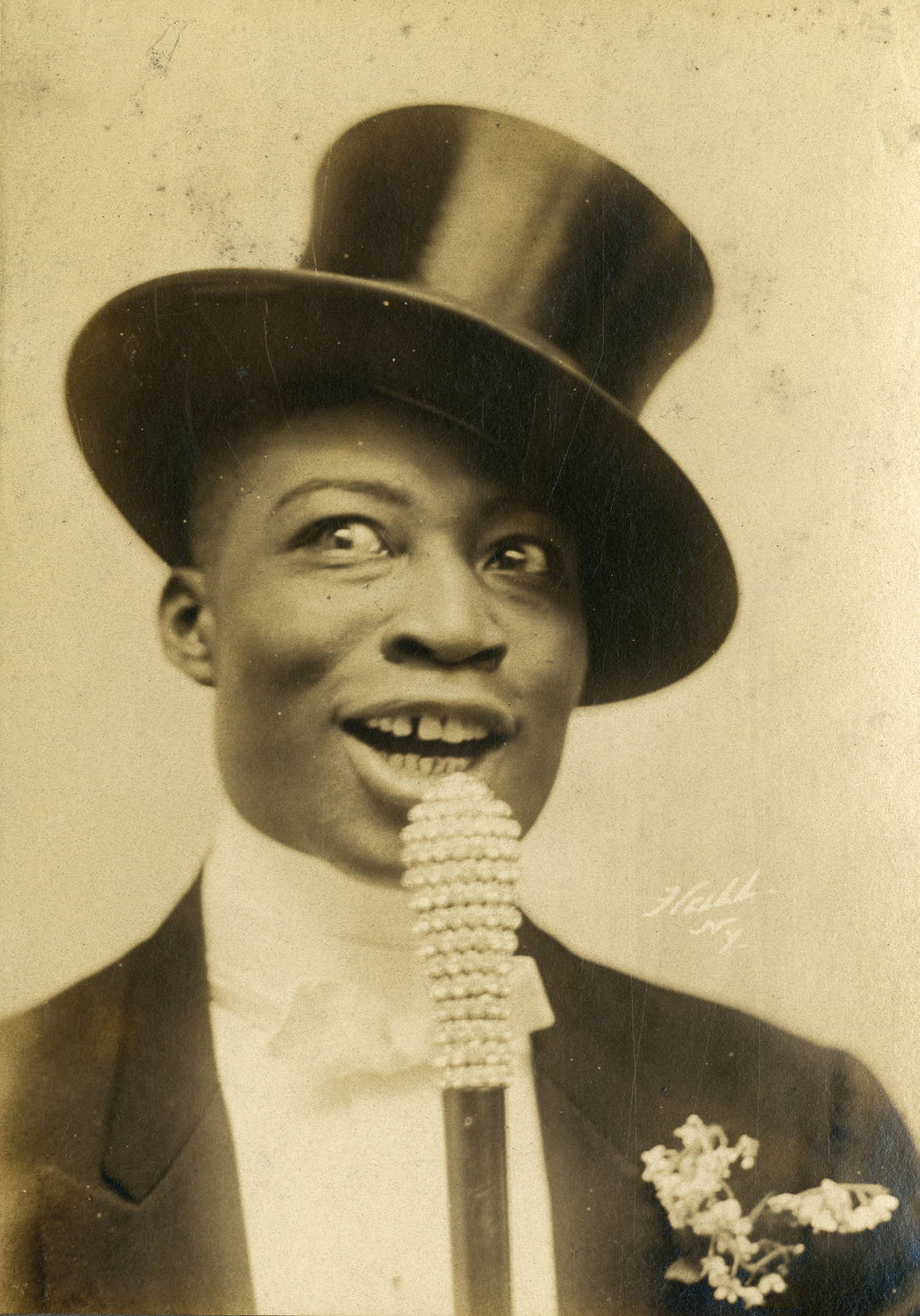
- Born: 1873; Lawrence
- Died: January 6, 1911
- Resting place: Oak Hill Cemetery
- Occupations: Actor, composer

Bert Williams & George Walker

George Walker (June 26, 1873 – January 6, 1911) was an American vaudevillian, actor, and producer. While in San Francisco during 1893, Walker at the age of 20 met Bert Williams, who was a year younger. The two young men became performing partners. Walker and Williams appeared in The Gold Bug (1895), Clorindy (1898), The Policy Player (1899), Sons of Ham (1900), In Dahomey (1903), Abyssinia (1906), and Bandanna Land (1907). Walker married dancer Ada Overton, who later also was a choreographer.

The two men set up an agency, The Williams and Walker Company, to support African-American actors and other performers, create networking, and produce new works.

== Early life ==
George W. Walker was born in 1873 in Lawrence, Kansas, the son of a policeman and his wife. He began his career as a child performer, touring in black minstrel and medicine shows.

== George Walker and Bert Williams ==
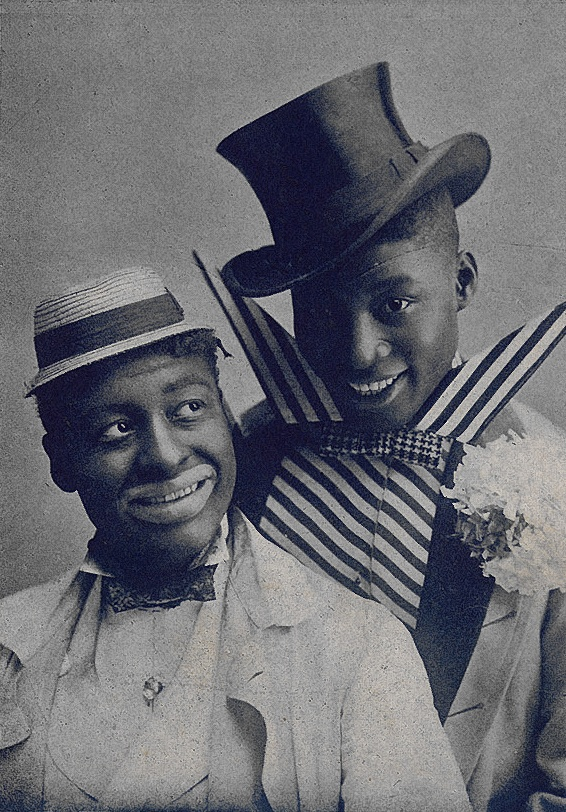
Williams & Walker

Walker and Bert Williams became two of the most prominent figures of the minstrel era and a famous duo. They met in 1893 in San Francisco and formed a vaudeville act when Walker was 20. Bert Williams had come to the United States as a child with his parents from the Bahamas, and became a vaudeville entertainer. Williams's first ambitions had been to attend Stanford University and become an engineer. Since he could not afford to go, he had worked as a singing waiter in hotels in San Francisco. Walker had performed in traveling medicine shows before ending up in San Francisco and joining up with Williams.

The two men decided to subvert vaudeville stereotypes and play against their appearances. With lighter skin expressing some European ancestry, and a fine voice, by the expectations of the time Williams would have performed as the "straight man" in comedy routines. Walker had darker skin and as such would be expected to play the fool. The two realized that they were much funnier when they reversed their roles, so "...Walker became the straight man--dressed a little too high-style and spending all the money he could borrow or trick out of the lazy, careless, unlucky Williams--and Williams became the blumbery, sorrowful, comical-in-spite-of-himself patsy." Their act grew popular in West Coast theatres, where the minstrel shows were being called vaudeville.

At the same time, white performing duos were billing themselves as "coons" (a disparaging term for Black people) and performing vaudeville in blackface. Williams and Walker decided to market themselves as the "Two Real Coons." In 1896, they appeared in a New York City production called The Gold Bug at the Casino Theatre. It was a short run and the production did not receive good reviews, but they were hired by another theatre for a record run of twenty-eight weeks. During that time, they popularized the cakewalk. This dance became very popular in high society in New York City and spread throughout all classes of whites. Their next project was The Sons of Ham. Williams and Alex Rogers wrote a song for it called "I'm a Jonah Man", and the song became a trademark for Williams. They participated in a "Benefit for New York's Poor" held on February 9, 1897 at the Metropolitan Opera House, their only appearance at that theater.

When Williams and Walker began to perform together, they wanted to change the dynamics of the theatre. But, they also had to satisfy audience demand, and audiences were predominately white. They began to feature the traditional cakewalk, a dance from slavery times. It is known to have been based in West African festive dances commonly performed during harvest festivals. Couples would form a circle, promenade, prance with buckets of water on their heads to the sound of banjos playing, and clap their hands. The winning couple got a cake.

When Williams and Walker worked with the cakewalk, "the dance had many variations and in some was apparently a slightly veiled comic parody of their masters' pretentious posturing and high falutin' attitudes." After Williams and Walker introduced this dance into their act, the cakewalk started being danced in stage shows, exhibitions, contests, and ballrooms. These were open only to white communities, with different venues appealing to working class through upper class. It eventually spread through the United States and over to Europe.

The two men were interested in incorporating African themes and characters into American shows. That opportunity came with the production of In Dahomey. Williams and Walker teamed up with composer Will Marion Cook, librettist Jesse Ship, and poet/lyricist Paul Laurence Dunbar to produce the musical comedy, In Dahomey, the first full-length musical to open on Broadway written and performed entirely by Black people. This musical comedy had all original music and was supported by scenery and props. Unlike the vaudeville shows, it had a complete story line from beginning to end, although the songs were often loosely related to it.

Some critics have suggested that the story lines of later Bing Crosby and Bob Hope comedy films were similar. "The Crosby/Hope films may well have been inspired by Williams and Walker shows like 'In Dahomey'." This show generated so much success that it received great reviews in London, and toured throughout the United Kingdom and United States.

Williams and Walker worked very hard to produce quality theatre. They wanted their sets and costumes to be just as extravagant as those in the white theatres. They also had great lighting and elaborate props. Walker was the more business-savvy of the two and handled most of the management responsibilities of their productions. Walker's goal was to elevate the professionalism in black theatre. By 1906, Williams and Walker were active in organizing an African-American actors' union called The Negro's Society.

In 1908, Walker founded The Frogs, an organization for African-American professional entertainers. It was a place for Black entertainers to get together and socialize in order to get to know each other and to create a support base. His organization held events that included black acts, dining, and dancing. They encouraged young performers to achieve a standard of excellence in their stage work.

The team produced and starred in two more successful plays, In Abyssinia and their final show, Bandanna Land (1907). Walker was taken ill and forced to retire from show business in the middle of the 1908-1909 season.

== Death ==
While touring with Bandanna Land in 1909, Walker began to stutter and suffer memory loss. They were the symptoms of syphilis. He died on January 6, 1911, in a sanitarium in Long Island and was buried at Oak Hill Cemetery, in his hometown of Lawrence, Kansas.

== Williams's later years ==
After Walker died, Williams had a hard time keeping their company operating. He was approached by Florenz Ziegfeld to perform in his Follies. Williams agreed and signed a three-year contract. The white actors threatened to walk out because they did not want competition from a black actor, but changed their minds when Ziegfeld said he could replace any of them except for Williams, because he was unique and talented. After his contract was up, Williams performed for another three years with the Follies because of his success.

By 1913, Williams gained success as a recording star. He starred in two short, silent films, Fish and Natural Born Gamblers, in 1916.

In 1920, he appeared in the Broadway Brevities of 1920, followed by Shuffle Along, in 1921. This seemed to reopen Broadway to black musicals. He produced an all-black show called Under the Bamboo Tree, which was not a great success. His health began to fail, and Williams died on March 4, 1922.

== Contributions ==
Walker became more than an entertainer, and was considered a race leader. He made many significant contributions through his shows and the management of his The Williams and Walker Company.

=== Contributions as an artist ===
As vaudevillians, Walker and Williams reached the top of national theatre by performing on Broadway and beyond. Vaudeville was known for its performers' playing to the audience, creating an air of intimacy usually absent in legitimate theater. Walker and Williams brought some of this intimacy to In Dahomey (1903) and Bandanna Land (1907-1909). They fought against racism and challenged stereotypes, as well as teaching white audiences about African-American culture.

In Dahomey In Dahomey (1903) was the first full-length African-themed musical comedy. Led by Bert Williams and George Walker, it broke the color line on Broadway. The musical tells a story about a group of African Americans who find a pot of gold and move to Africa to become rulers of Dahomey. The film's song "Swing Along" captured the mindset of black artists. In this song, dialect speech encouraged black audiences to “lif’ a’ yo’ heads up high, Wif’ pride an’ gladness beaming’ from ya’ eye,” encouraged people to “swing along” despite the pervasive white gaze; to ”swing along” even though “white fo’ks jealous when you’se walkin’ two by two”; to “swing along despite the horrors and dehumanization of life under Jim Crow”.

Bandanna Land (1907-1909)

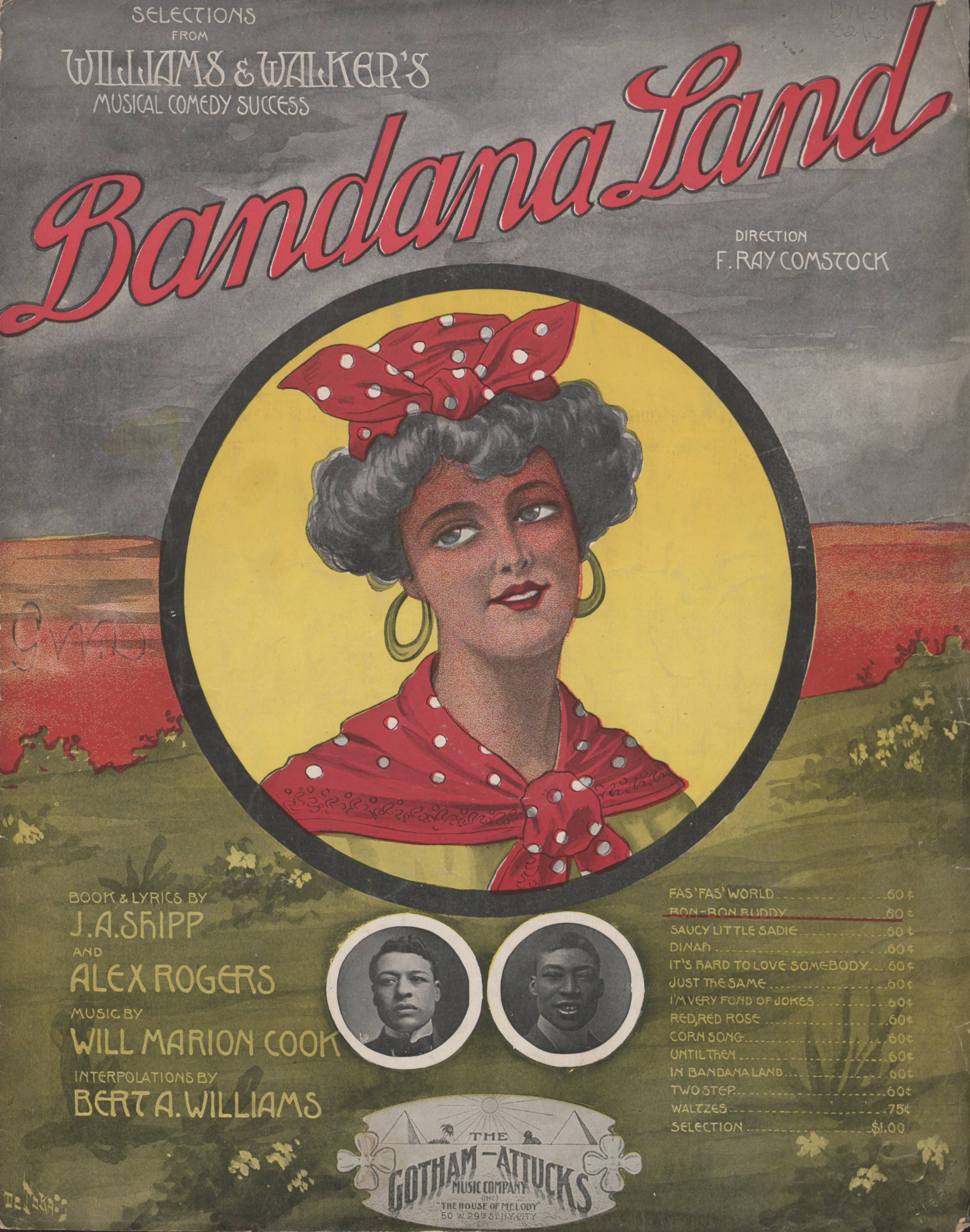
Cover of the song "Bon Bon Buddy" that closed Act 2 of the 1908 musical "Bandanna Land". Bert Williams is in the photo on the lower left; George Walker on the lower right

The story is about African-American realtors putting one over on white folks. Preying on white fears of a black-owned, black-controlled public space, the realty corporation opened an African-American amusement park and “organized a big noisy negro jubilee to raise such Hades that the people bought them out” at an inflated price. Again, Williams and Walker addressed segregated public space, white racist stereotypes, and African-American exploitation of stereotypes for economic gain. According to Sotiropoulos, while most white reviewers commented on the show's “negro flavor”, or praised its “picturesque rural scenery”, and "naturalness", they did not understand that the larger joke was on the whites' being taken advantage of due to their racism.

The phenomenal success of The Williams and Walker Company was in part a result of their willingness to push the boundaries of stereotypes in the minstrel era. However, critics have noted that this boundary pushing had limits when being performed for a white audience. This was something contemporary black critics fully appreciated.

=== Contributions as a business owner ===
“We thought that as there seemed to be a great demand for black faces on the stage, we would do all we could to get what we felt belonged to us by the law of nature.” - George Walker

As a leader of The William and Walker Company, Walker provided a place for talented colored artists to gather and communicate, which encouraged African American performers’ presence on stage.

==== Providing a meeting space for Black artists ====
Once Williams and Walker first became successful in New York with their 1896 vaudeville act, their “first move was to hire a flat in Fifty-third Street, furnish it, and throw our door open to all colored men who possessed theatrical and musical ability and ambition.” They wanted to provide a space where “all professional colored people could meet and exchange views and feel perfectly at home,” and their own flat became “the headquarters of all artistic young men of our race who were stage struck.” Walker explained, “by having these men around”, he and Williams “had an opportunity to study the musical and theatrical ability of the most talented members of our race.” (Theater Magazine, August 1906) Later, this place was known as the most “culturally stylish” black area of the city, became the center of the black theatrical world offstage and was later referred to as “Black Broadway” and “Black Bohemia.”

==== Providing jobs for Black artists ====
In addition to offering a creative outlet to talented Black American performers, The William and Walker Company supported their performers with pay. They put a lot of their earnings back to their company, supporting the actors, writers, musicians, stagehands, and the rest of the personnel who made their company so successful.

As Walker said, “Figuring out how many families that would support. Then look at the multifaceted talent we are employing and encouraging. Now, do you see us in the light of a race institution?” The New York Age commended him for bringing “about conditions providing positions for colored writers, composers and performers— positions paying large salaries,” and declared him to be “the commander-in-chief of the colored theatrical forces.”

== See also ==
- The Frogs (club)
- African-American musical theater
- Blues dance
