= Cook House =

Cook House may refer to:

== In the United States ==
(by state then city)

- Cook House (North Little Rock, Arkansas), NHRP # 93001250
- John Cook House, New Haven, Connecticut, listed on the National Register of Historic Places (NRHP)
- William H. Cook Water Tank House, Jerome, Idaho, listed on the NRHP
- John W. Cook Hall, Normal, Illinois, listed on the NRHP
- Cook Farm (Charles City, Iowa), listed on the NRHP
- Clarissa Cook Home for the Friendless, Davenport, Iowa, listed on the NRHP
- Cook House (Alexandria, Louisiana), NHRP # 79001086
- William Cook House (Cambridge, Massachusetts), listed on the NRHP
- Whitney-Farrington-Cook House, Waltham, Massachusetts, listed on the NRHP
- Asa M. Cook House, Reading, Massachusetts, listed on the NRHP
- Thomas Cook House (Somerville, Massachusetts), listed on the NRHP
- A. E. Cook House, Uxbridge, Massachusetts, listed on the NRHP
- Cook-Sellers House, DeSoto, Mississippi, listed on the NRHP in Mississippi
- Cook House (Hazlehurst, Mississippi), NHRP # 83003941
- Cook Farm (Missoula, Montana), listed on the NRHP in Missoula County
- Harold J. Cook Homestead Cabin, Agate, Nebraska, listed on the NRHP
- Will Marion Cook House, New York, New York, listed on the NRHP
- William Cook House (Mebane, North Carolina), listed on the NRHP
- John Cook Farm, Harlem, Ohio, listed on the NRHP in Delaware County
- Unzicker-Cook House, Oxford, Ohio, listed on the NRHP
- Shipley-Cook Farmstead, Lake Oswego, Oregon, listed on the NRHP in Clackamas County
- Cook-Bateman Farm, Tiverton, Rhode Island, listed on the NRHP
- Fox-Cook Farm, Wallingford, Vermont, listed on the NRHP
- Cook House (Parkersburg, West Virginia), listed on the NHRPin Wood County (#78002812)
- Thomas Cook House (Milwaukee, Wisconsin), NRHP-listed

== See also ==
- Cookhouse, a small building where cooking takes place
- Cook Farm (disambiguation)
- Thomas Cook House (disambiguation)
- William Cook House (disambiguation)
- Cooke House (disambiguation)
- Cookhouse, Eastern Cape
