= William Cook House =

William Cook House may refer to:

- William H. Cook Water Tank House, Jerome, Idaho, listed on the National Register of Historic Places (NRHP)
- William Cook House (Cambridge, Massachusetts), listed on the NRHP
- William Cook House (Mebane, North Carolina), listed on the NRHP

== See also ==
- Cook House (disambiguation)
