= Hattie King Reavis =

US singer (1890–1970)

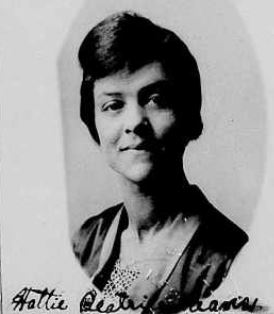
- Reavis in 1919
- Born: Hattie Beatrice King; November 18, 1890; Woodsworth, Vance County, North Carolina
- Died: March 12, 1970 (aged 79); New York City
- Other names: H. King Reavis, Hattie Beatrice Reavis
- Occupations: singer, actress
- Years active: 1919–1949

Hattie King Reavis, also known as H. King Reavis or Hattie Beatrice Reavis (November 18, 1890 – March 12, 1970), was a singer, songwriter, and theater performer from the United States. She performed with fellow African Americans in New York City in the 1920s, toured Europe on various trips through 1930, and recorded with Black Swan Records. In addition to singing, she worked as a recruiter for the Southern Syncopated Orchestra and later managed the career of Urylee Leonardos. From the 1930s to the end of 1940, she acted in New York in various shows, such as in the touring ensemble of the 1932 Broadway revival of Show Boat and several performances of On Strivers Row by Abram Hill. In 2019, selections from artists of Black Swan Records, including Reavis, were digitized, edited, and released by Parnassus Records.

== Early life ==
Hattie Beatrice King was born in Woodsworth, North Carolina, on November 18, 1890, to Lucy Davis and Wiley King. She married Stephen J. Reavis on July 8, 1914, in Manhattan.

== Career ==
In March 1919, Reavis was hired as a soprano vocalist for the Southern Syncopated Orchestra. The orchestra toured through various venues in Ohio and Indiana, before performing on April 20 in Chicago at Orchestra Hall. Three ships carried the 36 members of the troupe to England. Reavis sailed on the first one, the SS Northland, arriving in Liverpool in June. The first performance occurred in London in July, and a reviewer from The Musical Standard praised Reavis' rendition of Swanee River. Singing in various venues in London, including a performance at Buckingham Palace, a run of performances at the Philharmonic Hall, and at the Royal Albert Hall, Reavis received favorable press reviews. In December, the orchestra began touring, with appearances in Glasgow, Edinburgh and Liverpool. After that, sections of the orchestra continued touring throughout the country until 1921, with more favorable press reports for Reavis. A critic for The Graphic in London praised her as a "colored prima donna" and noted Listen to the Lambs was "exquisitely rendered. A reviewer for the Nottingham Guardian added that her singing of Sinner, Please, Don' Let dis Harvest Pass received two standing ovations. Her repertoire included Dear Old Pal of Mine, Give Me All of You, Good Morning Brother Sunshine, Mammy's Little Coal Black Rose, and The Awakening.

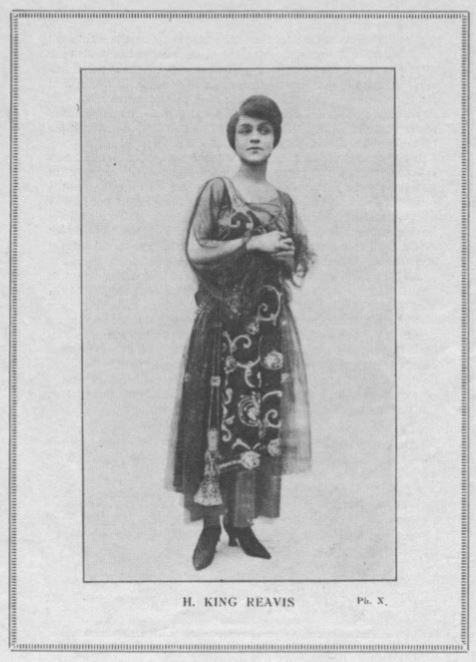
Reavis, 1921

From January 1921, Reavis worked as a talent scout, recruiting members for the orchestra, such as Elmer Certain, Farley Berry Graden, Herbert Eugene Parker, and Walter Bernard Williams for the tour. Williams died soon thereafter in the sinking of the SS Rowan in October 1921 along with at least one other band member. The ship collided with two other vessels near Corsewall Point and sank, leaving 13 crew members and three passengers unaccounted for. Reavis, who was aboard, survived, but lost her passport, according to her affidavit when applying for a replacement. Resuming touring, she performed with the orchestra in Vienna between October and November 1921, returning there in the summer of 1922. She sang in September in Prague, and Budapest, before returning to the United States on December 13, 1922.

As early as 1921, Reavis was recorded in songs for Harry Pace's Black Swan Records. Florence Cole Talbert, Antoinette Garnes, Kemper Herreld, and Reavis were selected by Pace for his "Red Label" series. In 1922, advertisements in The Crisis confirmed the label had released in April her recording of There Is a Green Hill Far Away / I'm So Glad Trouble Don't Last Always. She also sang an arrangement by R. Nathaniel Dett for Black Swan of I'm So Glad in 1923. That year she played the principal role in The Sheik of Harlem (1923), opposite Irvin C. Miller. The show was a musical production held at Harlem's Lafayette Theatre. Theophilus Lewis, known for his disdain for Harlem productions, gave a good review, praising Reavis for her rendition of It Don't Pay to Love a Northern Man in from the South. In the production, together with Alonzo Fenderson, she sang Just the Man We Can't Forget in tribute to the deceased president Warren G. Harding. It was well received by audiences.

Throughout 1924, Reavis worked the recital circuit, singing at churches in New York, North Carolina and Virginia. She received a favorable review for her role in the 1925 production Chocolate Dandies, before returning to Europe in December. She performed in the revue Black People produced by Louis Douglas in Berlin and Zürich in 1926. She then performed in the Creole Review, touring Norway, Sweden, Russia, Italy, Egypt, Turkey, Greece, and then back through France, Belgium and Germany. She was accompanied by Amanda Ira Aldridge, daughter of Ira Aldridge, in London in 1928 in a version of one of Reavis's own songs. In April 1930, she returned from Gibraltar to the U.S.

Reavis performed in 1930 in a Douglas' revue, Brownskin Models of 1931 at the Lafayette Theater. In 1932, she gave recitals and acted in the touring company of Show Boat. She appeared in Abram Hill's On Strivers Row in 1940 at the New York Public Library branch in Harlem and in a second production held in Harlem at the American Negro Theater in 1946. Reavis was elected to serve on the board of the American Guild of Variety Artists for the New York Chapter in 1940 and 1946 became the executive secretary of the American Negro Theater. She continued to act through the end of the 1940s, also writing songs. On retiring from singing in 1949, Reavis managed the career of Urylee Leonardos.

== Death and legacy ==
Reavis died on March 12, 1970, in New York. In 2019, her recordings and those of Cole-Talbert from Black Swan records were selected for inclusion in a CD, Black Swans, produced by Parnassus Records in Woodstock, New York. The CD included 22 performances, transferred from the 78-rpm records and digitally cleaned up to make modern audiences aware of the rare recordings. The order of her selections was reversed from the original 1921 recording, where Charles Gounod's song had appeared on side A and Robert Nathaniel Dett's was on side B.

== Discography ==
- "There Is a Green Hill" by Gounod / "Make More Room Anon" (1921) arranged by Dett.
- "There is a Green Hill Far Away" by Gounod / "I'm So Glad Trouble Doesn't Last Always" (1922)
- "I'm So Glad" (1923) arranged by Dett
