= Thomas Cook House =

Thomas Cook House may refer to:

- Thomas Cook House (Somerville, Massachusetts), listed on the National Register of Historic Places (NRHP)
- Thomas Cook House (Milwaukee, Wisconsin), NRHP-listed

== See also ==
- Cook House (disambiguation)
