= Cook Farm =

Cook Farm may refer to:

in the United States

(by state then city)

- Cook Farm (Charles City, Iowa), listed on the National Register of Historic Places (NRHP)
- Cook Farm (Missoula, Montana), listed on the NRHP in Missoula County
- John Cook Farm, Harlem, Ohio, listed on the NRHP in Delaware County
- Shipley-Cook Farmstead, Lake Oswego, Oregon, listed on the NRHP in Clackamas County
- Cook-Bateman Farm, Tiverton, Rhode Island, listed on the NRHP
- Fox-Cook Farm, Wallingford, Vermont, listed on the NRHP

== See also ==
- Cook House (disambiguation)
