= Mazie Withers =

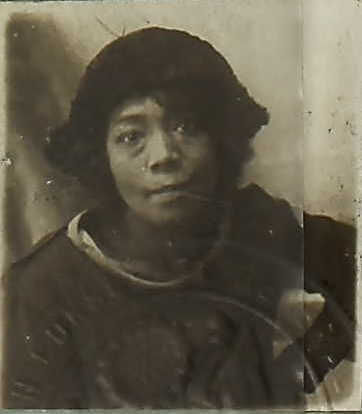
- Born: December 17, 1888; Denver
- Died: October 14, 1921 (aged 32); Paris
- Occupation: Musician
- Spouse(s): Frank D. Withers

Mazie Mullins Withers (December 17, 1888 – October 14, 1921) was an American saxophonist and trombonist. She was one of the early African-American musicians to bring jazz to Europe.

Mazie Mullins was born on December 17, 1888 in Denver, Colorado. She married trombonist Frank Withers and they toured as the vaudeville duo Withers and Withers. She went on to play in the orchestras at the Howard Theatre in Washington, DC and the Lafyette Theatre in Harlem. In 1917 she appeared in Will Marion Cook’s Jazz Land at the New Standard Theater in Philadelphia. She toured with the New York Syncopated Orchestra in America and the Southern Syncopated Orchestra in the UK. In 1921, she was running the Tempo Club on rue Fontaine in Montmartre in Paris. Poet Philippe Soupault portrayed her as Milly in his lengthy essay on dance, Terpsichore (1928).

Mazie Withers died of appendicitis at the American Hospital of Paris on October 14, 1921.
