= Evelyn Anderson =

Evelyn Anderson may refer to:

- Evelyn M. Anderson (1899–1985), American physiologist and biochemist
- Evelyn Anderson (journalist) (1909–1977), German-British journalist and joint editor of the left-wing newspaper Tribune
- Evelyn Anderson (dancer) (1907–1994), American dancer
- Evelyn Daniel Anderson (1926–1998), American educator and advocate for physically disabled people
