= Philharmonic Hall =

Philharmonic Hall also known as Philharmonie refers to concert halls that have an in-house orchestra:

- Elbphilharmonie, Hamburg, Germany
- Gewandhaus Philharmonie, Augustusplatz, Leipzig, Germany
- Berliner Philharmonie, Berlin, Germany
- Philharmonic Hall, Cologne, Germany
- David Geffen Hall at the Lincoln Center for the Performing Arts, New York, US; known as Philharmonic Hall at its opening in 1962, renamed for Avery Fisher in 1973, and renamed for David Geffen in 2015
- Azerbaijan State Philharmonic Hall in Baku, Azerbaijan
- Philharmonic Hall, Liverpool, UK
- Philharmonic Hall, London, UK
- Petronas Philharmonic Hall, Kuala Lumpur, Malaysia

== See also ==
- Philharmonie (disambiguation)
