= Abbie Mitchell =

American opera singer (1884–1960)

Abbie Mitchell Cook
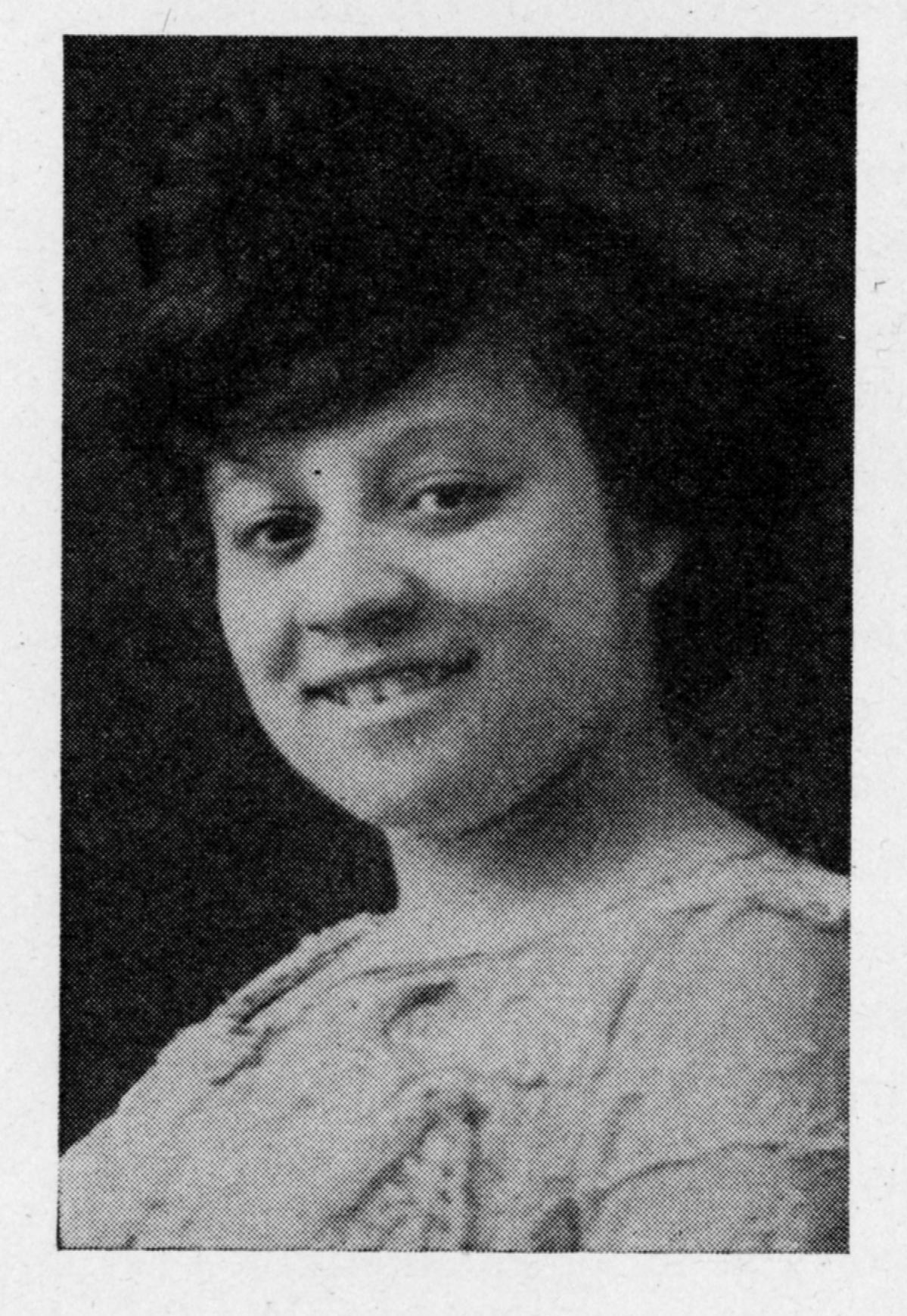
- Born: Abriea Mitchell; September 25, 1884; New York City, U.S.
- Died: March 16, 1960 (aged 75); Harlem Hospital, New York, United States
- Notable work: Porgy and Bess as Clara; first recording of "Summertime"
- Spouse: Will Marion Cook (m. 1898; died 1944)
- Children: 2, including William Mercer Cook
- Relatives: Louis Douglas (son-in-law)

Abriea "Abbie" Mitchell Cook (née Mitchell; 25 September 1884 – 16 March 1960), also billed as Abbey Mitchell, was an American soprano opera singer. She performed the role of Clara in the premiere production of George Gershwin's Porgy and Bess in 1935, and was also the first to record "Summertime" from that musical.

== Early life ans education ==
Mitchell was the mixed-race daughter of an African-American mother and a Jewish-German father from New York City's Lower East Side. She was reared by a maternal aunt, Alice Payne, in Baltimore, Maryland, where she attended a Catholic convent school.

Mitchell never completed her formal schooling in Baltimore. Following the death of her father, she traveled to New York to spend the summer with her other aunt.

== Career ==
At the age of fourteen, she was discovered singing from the fire escape of her aunt's apartment by the composer Will Marion Cook and lyricist Paul Laurence Dunbar; they cast her for a role in their one-act musical comedy Clorindy: The Origin of the Cakewalk (1898). It was so successful that it ran for the whole season at the Casino Roof Garden.

Mitchell married Cook a year later, and appeared in the lead role in his Jes Lak White Folks (1899). She also appeared in his production The Southerners (1904). Cook and Mitchell had a daughter, Marion Abigail Cook, in 1900, and a son, Will Mercer Cook, in 1903.

In London, Mitchell appeared in the 1903 musical In Dahomey, produced by the team of George Walker and Bert Williams, with music composed by her husband Cook, book by J.A. Shipp, and lyrics by poet Paul Laurence Dunbar. The cakewalk, considered old-fashioned by the cast, was almost cut from the show, but proved popular with audiences. It became a fad in the United Kingdom. Mitchell received international acclaim for her performance, and at age 17 she was invited to appear with the company in a Royal Command Performance for King Edward VII and Queen Alexandra at Buckingham Palace.

Mitchell later performed with the "Black Patti's Troubadours", and in the operetta The Red Moon (1908) by Bob Cole and J. Rosamond Johnson. In 1913, she appeared in the film Lime Kiln Field Day with Bert Williams, which was produced by Klaw and Erlanger, but they never finished or released it. In 1919, Mitchell went to Europe with Cook's Southern Syncopated Orchestra. In New York, she appeared on the concert stage and in opera.

Lee de Forest made a short film, Songs of Yesteryear (1922), of Mitchell singing, using his DeForest Phonofilm sound-on-film process. This film is preserved in the Maurice Zouary film collection at the Library of Congress.

Mitchell appeared in several Broadway plays, including In Abraham's Bosom (1926), Coquette (1927) starring Helen Hayes, and The Little Foxes (1939) starring Tallulah Bankhead.

Mitchell was best known for performing in the role of Clara in the premiere of George Gershwin's Porgy and Bess (1935); this was her last musical role on the stage. She was the first singer to record "Summertime" from the opera. After this, "she taught and coached many singers in New York and appeared in many 'spoken' dramatic roles on the stage." In 1939, she played the role of Tallulah Bankhead's intelligent and trusted servant in The Little Foxes on Broadway. She also performed in New York City in other productions and taught at the Tuskegee Institute in Alabama.

Their daughter, raised by family members as Mitchell had been, married dancer Louis Douglas. Their son became a professor at Howard University and a translator. He was later appointed as United States Ambassador to Niger and Senegal.

Mitchell died in New York on March 16, 1960, and was given a Catholic funeral.

== See also ==
- African American musical theater
- Rose McClendon
- Evelyn Ellis
