= Evelyn Anderson (dancer) =

American dancer (1907–1994)

- Born: 1907
- Died: October 29, 1994 (aged 86–87); Philadelphia, Pennsylvania
- Occupation: Dancer
- Spouse: Robert Robbins

Evelyn Anderson (1907 – October 29, 1994) was an American dancer. She appeared in productions by Eubie Blake and Noble Sissle and on Broadway in the revue Blackbirds of 1928. She was 18 years old when she was selected for an all-Black vaudeville troupe due to perform in Paris. La Revue Negre was headlined by Josephine Baker and toured both Germany and Belgium. After La Revue Negre broke up, Anderson stayed in Europe for 15 years. She performed alongside Florence Mills and Hattie King Reavis.

Anderson was performing at a cabaret in The Hague when World War II broke out. After the Nazis occupied the Netherlands, she was detained for three years. She was finally released through a prisoner exchange and returned to the United States in 1944.

== Early life ==
Evelyn Anderson was born in 1907 to an African American family. She started dancing at a young age and her parents sent her to a dance school in Philadelphia. She was encouraged to dance professionally by musicians who saw her dancing the Charleston at a party.

Anderson was cast in musical productions and revues, including those of Eubie Blake and Noble Sissle. She was in the Broadway revue Blackbirds of 1928 and may have also appeared in the Broadway musical Shuffle Along. While she was working as a chorus girl at a revue at the Smile Awhile Inn in Asbury Park, she was recruited for an as-yet-unnamed show in Paris.

== Performing in Europe ==
Anderson was 18 years old when she was recruited by Caroline Dudley to perform in Paris as part of an all-Black vaudeville show. On September 15, 1925, she set sail from New York with the cast of 30 performers.

The revue in Paris was La Revue Negre headlined by Josephine Baker. Anderson performed in the cast, as part of a dance ensemble called The Charleston Steppers. They performed at the Théâtre des Champs-Élysées and other venues.

Anderson befriended Baker and later recalled that Baker "could be quite exotic in her manner sometimes. Once she scared everybody by wearing a snake as a necklace." Anderson continued touring with La Revue Negre and Baker in Germany and Belgium.

In 1926, after Baker broke her contract to go to the Folies Bergère, the La Revue Negre group disbanded. Anderson chose to remain in Europe, performing at night clubs and revues for the next 15 years. In 1926, she performed with Florence Mills as part of the cast of Blackbirds, a revue by Lew Leslie. She dated the saxophone player Joe Hayman.

Louis Douglas had arranged a performance in Berlin of the two-act production Black People. Anderson was part of the troupe, performing around Europe, including in Sweden and the Netherlands. Anderson was also a member of the troupe Southern Delights, which starred Hattie King Reavis, Honey Boy Thompson, and Maud de Forest.

== World War II detention ==
When World War II broke out, Anderson was performing in The Hague at a cabaret. She was part of the ballroom dance team Harry and Evelyn with Harry Watkins. When the Nazis occupied the Netherlands in 1941, Watkins was sent back to the United States, while Anderson was detained. She was first sent to a Dutch internment camp before being transferred to a German convent. She was detained for three years. She was finally released to the United States in 1944 through a prisoner exchange.

== Later life ==
Following her return to the United States, Anderson married Philadelphia bass player and orchestra leader Robert Robbins in 1944.

Anderson died of pneumonia on October 29, 1994, at the Misericordia Hospital in Philadelphia. She was 87.

== See also ==
- African Americans in France
- Negrophilia
