= Cooke House =

Cooke House may refer to:

in the United States

- Andrew B. Cooke House, Virginia Beach, Virginia, designed by Frank Lloyd Wright.
- Wm. L. Cooke House, Columbus, GA, listed on the NRHP in Georgia
- Charles Montague Cooke Jr. House and Kūkaʻōʻō Heiau, Honolulu, HI, listed on the NRHP in Hawaii
- Clarence H. Cooke House, Honolulu, HI, listed on the NRHP in Hawaii
- E. V. Cooke House, Jerome, ID, listed on the NRHP in Idaho
- Peyton Cooke House, Oakland, KY, listed on the NRHP in Kentucky
- Frederick William Cooke Residence, Paterson, NJ, listed on the NRHP in New Jersey
- Noah Cooke House, Keene, NH, listed on the NRHP in New Hampshire
- Cooke House (Louisburg, North Carolina), listed on the NRHP in North Carolina
- Jay Cooke House, Gibraltar Island, OH, listed on the NRHP in Ohio
- Cooke–Robertson House, Sandusky, OH, listed on the NRHP in Ohio
- Eleutheros Cooke House (disambiguation), multiple places in Ohio
- Amos Cooke House, Scituate, RI, listed on the NRHP in Rhode Island
- Cooke–Kefauver House, Madisonville, TN, listed on the NRHP in Tennessee
