= George Lattimore =

American lawyer (1887-1963)

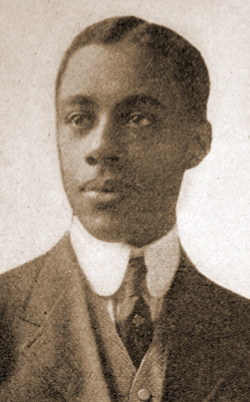
George Lattimore

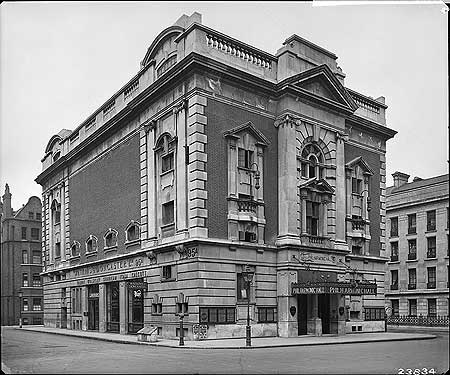
The Philharmonic Hall, London, as it appeared in 1917

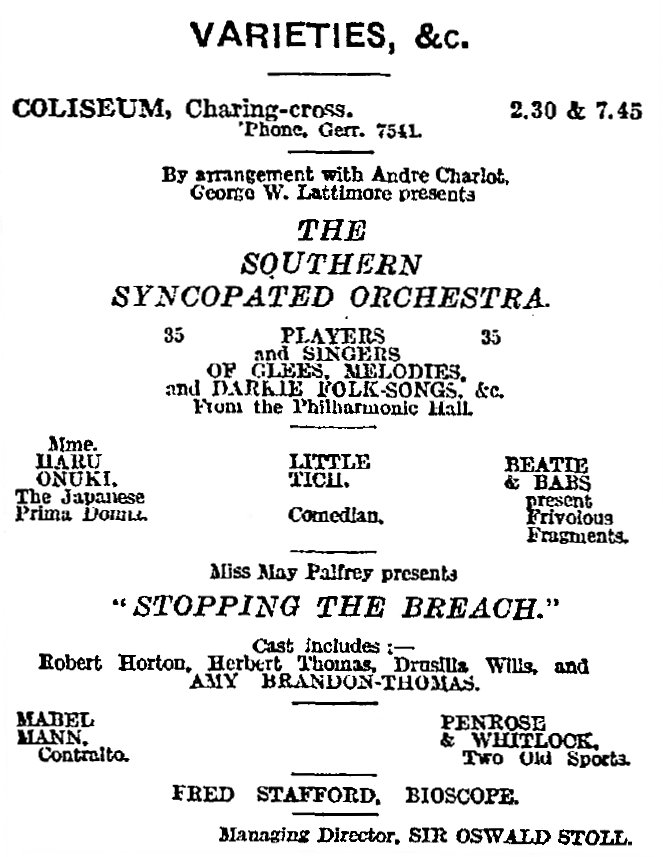
Advertising for the Southern Syncopated Orchestra in The Times, December 13, 1919

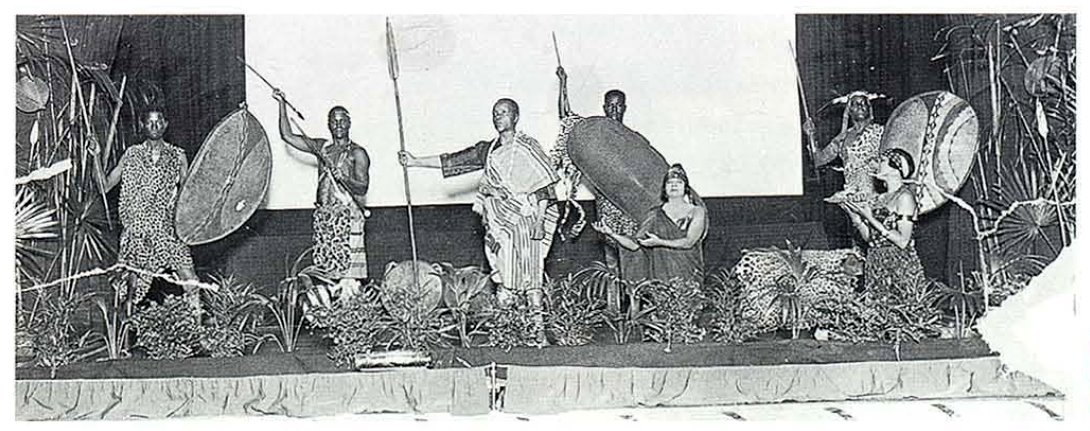
A scene from the stage show of Cradle of the World, 1923

George William Lattimore (1887 – 1963) was an American lawyer, sports manager, manager of the Southern Syncopated Orchestra, and a theatrical and cinema impresario.

== Early life ==
George Lattimore was born in New York City on March 27, 1887, the son of George W. Lattimore.

== Basketball ==
Lattimore was the founder and manager in 1906 of the Smart Set Athletic Club of Brooklyn, the first independent African-American basketball team who were the winners of the first World's Basketball Championship for Afro-people. The New York Age, a leading African-American newspaper, reported that the club was reorganised as the Smart Set Athletic Club Incorporated in 1916 with J. Hoffman Woods as Chairman, William F. Trotman as Treasurer and George Lattimore as Secretary.

== Southern Syncopated Orchestra ==
The New York Syncopated Orchestra was formed by Will Marion Cook in January 1919 with Lattimore as the manager. In May and June 1919, the orchestra, renamed the Southern Syncopated Orchestra (SSO), sailed for Britain on a six months' tour. The tour was a notable success. The orchestra was complimented for its varied repertoire and performed for the Prince of Wales (later King Edward VIII) at Buckingham Palace.

In 1919, Lattimore and Cook and others from the orchestra attended an event in London organised by a black student organisation, The Coitere of Friends, of which one of the founders was Edmund Thornton Jenkins who taught at the Royal Academy of Music. The event had a pan-African flavour and the room was decorated with the flags of Liberia and Haiti. Music by Samuel Coleridge-Taylor was played.

An internal split within the orchestra meant that at one point two different Southern Syncopated Orchestras were toured Britain at the same time, one led by Cook and the other by Lattimore, resulting in legal action in 1920.

The tour was interrupted by tragedy on October 9, 1921 when the SS Rowan, on which the orchestra were travelling from Glasgow to Derry, was involved in an accident and eight musicians were drowned. Lattimore was in Dublin at the time. The orchestra, in various forms, continued touring until 1922. A late incarnation of the SSO was Lattimore's Symphony Orchestra which appeared in Vienna in 1922 featuring trumpeter Tommy Smith, trombonist Ted Heath, Buddie Gilmore on drums and William Burns as vocalist.

== Wildest Africa ==
Wildest Africa, shown at the Philharmonic Hall, Great Portland Street in London in 1922, recorded a zoological expedition to Central Africa led by Prince William of Sweden.

== Cradle of the World ==
In 1923, Lattimore was promoting with Pathé, Cradle of the World, the "most marvellous and thrilling travel film ever screened". In a letter to the pan-Africanist W.E. Du Bois, Lattimore reported that he was having a "successful run" with the film at the Philharmonic Hall, where the SSO had also performed. Lattimore's letterhead by then boasted of the patronage of William of Sweden. In fact, the show received indifferent reviews and lasted only one month.

The show, which seems to have been based at least partly on Wildest Africa, included a musical interlude to enliven the proceedings and to cover up the changing of the film reels. Sol Plaatje, the first General Secretary of the South African Native National Congress (later the African National Congress), who was desperately in need of money, was recruited by Lattimore to take the role of an African tribesman.

== Family ==
Lattimore's brother, Robert P. Lattimore, was also a lawyer and practiced from the same office as George at 26 Cortlandt Street, New York City.

In 1926, Lattimore married the British artists' model Dolores (Norine Schofield) in London, her third marriage. The marriage was described as "secret" in more than one American newspaper. The couple quickly separated but never divorced. Dolores died in 1934.

== Death ==
Lattimore died December 1963. Sources for Dolores make no mention of his death and an article about Lattimore appeared in the New York Amsterdam News, August 24, 1932.
