= Will Marion Cook House =

Historic house in Manhattan, New York

- U.S. National Register of Historic Places
- U.S. National Historic Landmark
- U.S. Historic district – Contributing property
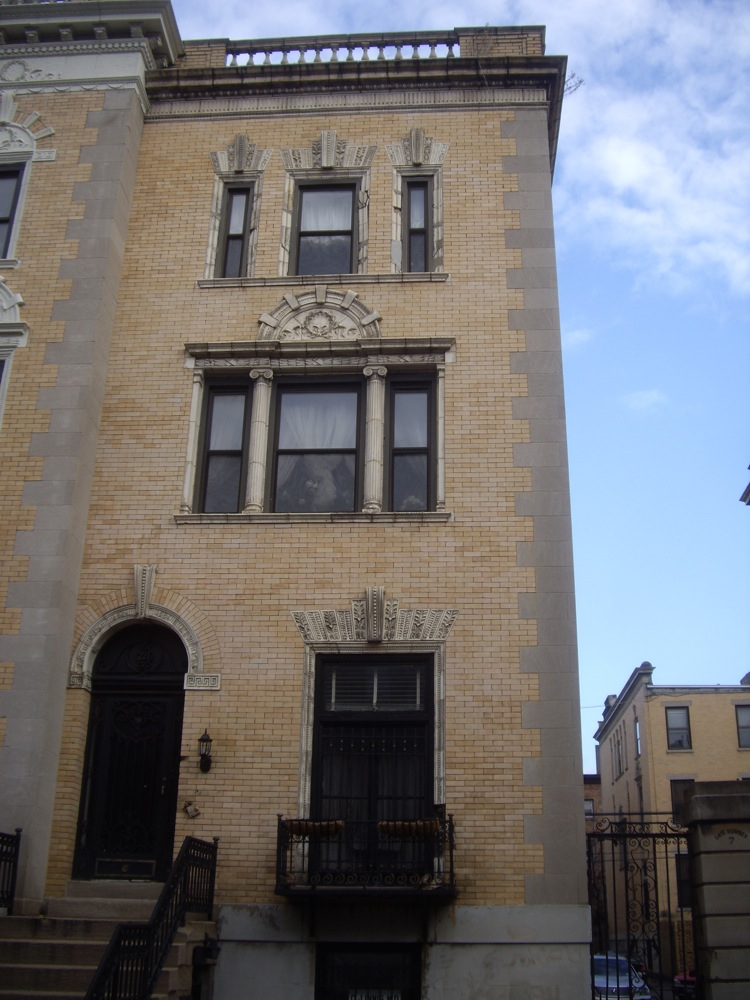

- Location within Manhattan Location within New York Location within the United States
- Location: 221 West 138th Street, Manhattan, New York City, New York
- Coordinates: 40°49′4″N 73°56′37″W
- Built: 1918
- Architect: D.H. King
- Architectural style: Georgian
- Part of: St. Nicholas Historic District (ID75001209)
- NRHP reference No.: 76001238

Significant dates
- Added to NRHP: May 11, 1976
- Designated NHL: May 11, 1976
- Designated CP: October 29, 1975

The Will Marion Cook House is a historic townhouse at 221 West 138th Street, in the part of Harlem known as Strivers' Row in Manhattan, New York City. It was the home of Will Marion Cook (1869-1944), a leading African-American musician and composer of the period, from 1918 until his death in 1944. Cook was a major influence on later musicians including Sidney Bechet, Duke Ellington, and Josephine Baker. It was declared a National Historic Landmark in 1976.

== Description and history ==
The Will Marion Cook House is located on the north side of West 138th Street, between 7th and 8th Avenues. This area, known as Strivers' Row, was home to a number of well-known people during the height of Harlem's cultural successes of the early 20th century. It is an end unit of a row of sixteen three-story Renaissance Revival brick rowhouses, built by developer David H. King in 1891. The ground floor is two bays wide, with the main entrance in the left bay, set in a rounded-arch opening. The second floor features a single three-part window, with narrow sidelights flanking a larger central sash, separated by Ionic columns; a half-round terra cotta panel above the center window gives the grouping the feel of a Palladian window. The third floor has a central sash window, separated from side narrow windows by brickwork. First and third-floor window bays, while all feature splayed lintels of terra cotta.

This house is where Will Marion Cook lived from 1918 to 1944. Called the "master of all masters of our people" by Duke Ellington, he was a leading black composer and musician, trained classically in the violin by Antonin Dvorak and others. Denied work in racist classical music circles, he made his influence felt as a composer and arranger in the theater, employing African-American musical styles and themes in his work. He was an early innovator in the use of musical improvisation, helping give rise to jazz and the Big Band Era. Cook was a mentor and influence on Eubie Blake and Duke Ellington, and helped further the career of his wife, soprano Abbie Mitchell.

== See also ==
- National Register of Historic Places listings in Manhattan above 110th Street
