= Harry Malcolm Wellmon =

American jazz musician (1883–1945)

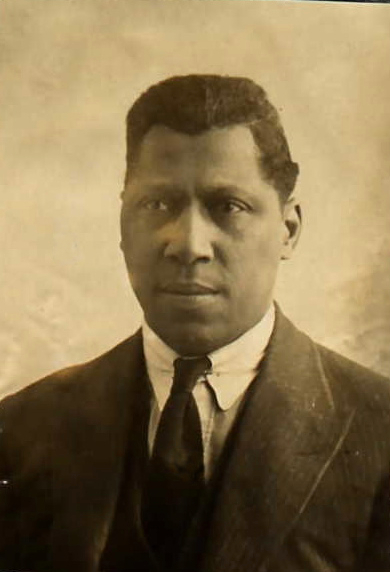
- Wellmon in 1921
- Born: May 15, 1883; Shelby, North Carolina
- Died: July 17, 1945 (aged 62); Manhattan, New York City
- Other name: H. W. Wellmon
- Occupations: Conductor and composer
- Spouse: Lavinia Elizabeth Jeffs
- Partner: Dick Carlish
- Parent: Andrew Wellmon

Harry Malcolm Wellmon (May 15, 1883 - July 17, 1945) sometimes known as H. W. Wellmon, was an African American-British Jazz Age conductor and composer who lived in London, England. He was part of the song-writing team of Carlish and Wellmon.

== Biography ==
He was born in Shelby, North Carolina on May 15, 1883, to Andrew Wellmon. By 1918 he was living in New York City and working at Sulzer's Harlem River Casino. He moved to London and married singer Lavinia Elizabeth Jeffs on April 16, 1919. He returned to New York City in 1938. He died on July 17, 1945, in Manhattan, New York City.

== Style ==
A 1921 review in Musical America described Wellmon conducting the Southern Syncopated Orchestra in France as

"...a superbly vigorous conductor in the uniform of a Brazilian general, wearing dazzling white gloves and green shoes, leads this heterogenous instrumental ensemble. He uses no score, and at times marches straight into his orchestra to stimulate some player who seems to lag; at others, when all is going as it should, he lowers his baton, and, hands behind his back, looks at the public with eyes twinkling with satisfaction ..."

== Compositions ==
- The Good Old British Isles (1906)
- The Fascée Dance (1914)
