= St Paul's Church (Portland Chapel) =

Former church in London

Coordinates: 51.5189°N 0.1426°W

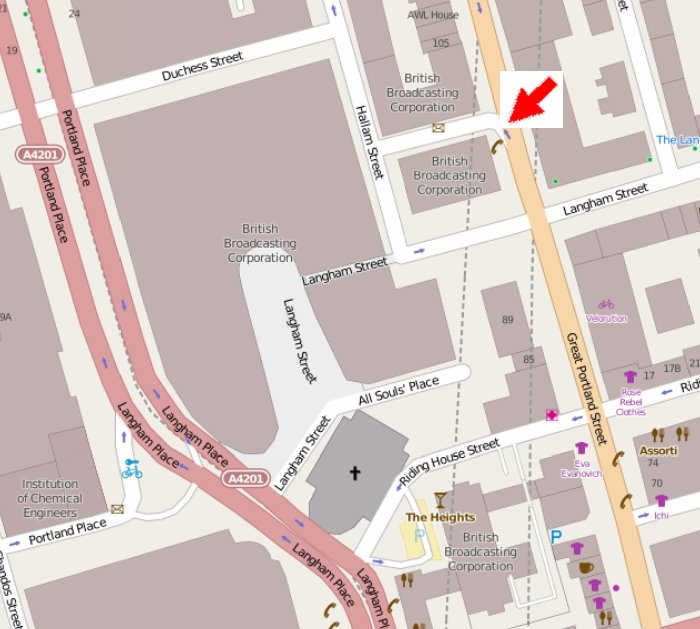
Location of the church (arrowed)

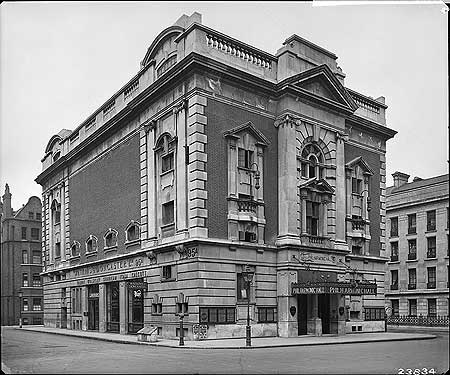
The Philharmonic Hall, constructed on the site of the St Paul's Church, as it appeared in 1917

St Paul's Church, for many years known as the Portland Chapel, was built in the eighteenth century on the site of the former Marylebone Basin reservoir in London. Today the site is occupied by the BBC and known as Brock House, originally the Philharmonic Hall.

The building was constructed in 1766 or 1775–6 of brick with a stone steeple and consecrated in 1831. It was designed by Stiff Leadbetter for the Portland Estates.

The Philharmonic Hall was built on the site of the church in 1907/08 to replace the St James's Hall in Regent Street which had been demolished in 1905.
