= Juice Wilson =

American jazz musician

Robert "Juice" Wilson (January 21, 1904 – May 22, 1993) was an American jazz violinist.

== Biography ==
Wilson grew up an orphan and was raised by his uncle from age three in Chicago. He began playing drums in the Chicago Militia Boys Band, then switched to violin at age eight. By the age of twelve he was already playing with Jimmy Wade, and at 14 he performed with Freddie Keppard. He worked on steamboats on the Great Lakes and did extended residencies with Jimmy Harrison in Ohio. Early in the 1920s he worked in Erie, Pennsylvania with Hersal Brassfield, then moved to Buffalo, New York to play with Eugene Primus as well as the Buffalo Junior Symphony Orchestra.

In 1928, Wilson moved to New York City and played with Lloyd Scott at the Savoy Ballroom. At the end of the decade he toured Europe with Noble Sissle, and decided to remain there. He worked first in the Netherlands with Ed Swayzee, Leon Abbey, the Utica Jubilee Singers, the Louis Douglass Revue, Little Mike McKendrick's International Band, and Tom Chase. He made trips to Spain and North Africa before settling in Malta, where he became a local star. He worked there through much of the 1940s and 1950s as a multi-instrumentalist, and made further tours around the Mediterranean before coming back to the United States in the 1960s.

He was admitted to Rush-Presbyterian-St. Luke's Hospital in Chicago on 25 June 1972, following the onset of emphysema and brochitis, among other complications, and died there soon after.
