= Sol Plaatje =

South African politician, writer and linguist (1876-1932)

Solomon Tshekisho Plaatje
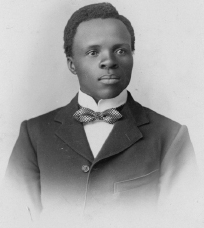
- Born: 9 October 1876; Doornfontein near Boshof, Orange Free State
- Died: 19 June 1932 (aged 55); Pimville, Soweto, Union of South Africa
- Resting place: West End Cemetery, Kimberley
- Occupations: Writer and political figure
- Known for: Founder member of the SANNC
- Spouse: Elizabeth Lilith M'belle
- Children: 6
- Plaatje's voice recorded October 1923

Solomon Tshekisho Plaatje (9 October 1876 – 19 June 1932) was a South African intellectual, journalist, linguist, politician, translator and writer. Plaatje was a founding member and first General Secretary of the South African Native National Congress (SANNC), which became the African National Congress (ANC). The Sol Plaatje Local Municipality, which includes the city of Kimberley, is named after him, as is the Sol Plaatje University in that city, which opened its doors in 2014.

== Early life ==
Plaatje was born in Doornfontein near Boshof, Orange Free State (now Free State Province, South Africa), the sixth of eight sons. His grandfather's name was Selogilwe Mogodi (1836-1881) but his employer, the Boer farmer Groenewald, nicknamed him Plaatje ('Picture') in 1856 and the family started using this as a surname. His parents Johannes and Martha were members of the Tswana nation. They were Christians and worked for missionaries at mission stations in South Africa. When Solomon was four, the family moved to Pniel near Kimberley in the Cape Colony to work for a German missionary, Ernst Westphal (the grandfather of the linguist Ernst Westphal) and his wife Wilhelmine. There he received a mission-education. When he outpaced fellow learners he was given additional private tuition by Mrs. Westphal, who also taught him to play the piano and violin and gave him singing lessons. In February 1892, aged 15, he became a pupil-teacher, a post he held for two years.

After leaving school, he moved to Kimberley in 1894 where he became a telegraph messenger for the Post Office. He subsequently passed the clerical examination (the highest in the colony) with higher marks than any other candidate in Dutch and typing (reported by Neil Parsons in his foreword to Native Life in South Africa, Before and Since the European War and the Boer Rebellion). At that time, the Cape Colony had qualified franchise for all men 21 or over, the qualification being that they be able to read and write English or Dutch and earn over 50 pounds a year. Thus, when he turned 21 in 1897, he was able to vote, a right he would later lose when the Cape Colony was merged with other Southern African colonies into the Union of South Africa.

Shortly thereafter, he became a court interpreter for the British colonial authorities in Mafeking when the settlement was under siege and kept a diary of his experiences which were published posthumously.

After the Second Boer War ended, he was optimistic that the British government would ensure that all males in South Africa would continue to be granted qualified franchise, but they instead handed over the majority of political power to the new South African government, which restricted voting rights to white South Africans only. Plaatje criticised the British government for this decision in an unpublished 1909 manuscript entitled Sekgoma – the Black Dreyfus.

== Career ==
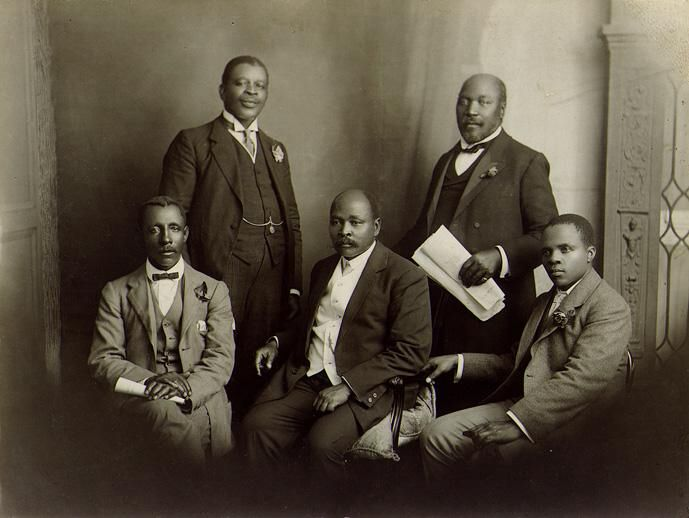
The South African Native National Congress delegation to England, June 1914. Left to right: Thomas Mapike, Rev. Walter Rubusana, Rev. John Dube, Saul Msane, Sol Plaatje

As an activist and politician, he spent much of his life in the struggle for the enfranchisement and liberation of African people. He was a founder member and first General Secretary of the South African Native National Congress (SANNC), which became the African National Congress (ANC) ten years later in 1922. As a member of an SANNC deputation, he traveled to England to protest against the Natives Land Act, 1913, and later to Canada and the United States where he met Marcus Garvey and W. E. B. Du Bois.

While he grew up speaking the Tswana language, Plaatje would become a polyglot. Fluent in at least seven languages, he worked as a court interpreter during the Siege of Mafeking, and translated works of William Shakespeare into Tswana. His talent for language would lead to a career in journalism and writing. He was editor and part-owner of Kuranta ya Becoana (Bechuana Gazette) in Mahikeng, and in Kimberley Tsala ya Becoana (Bechuana Friend) and Tsala ya Batho (The Friend of the People).

Plaatje was the first black South African to write a novel in English – Mhudi. He wrote the novel in 1919, but it was only published in 1930 (in 1928 the Zulu writer R. R. R. Dhlomo published an English-language novel, entitled An African Tragedy, at the missionary Lovedale Press, in Alice; this makes Dhlomo's novel the first published black South African novel in English, even though Plaatje's Mhudi had been written first). He also wrote Native Life in South Africa, which Neil Parsons describes as "one of the most remarkable books on Africa by one of the continent's most remarkable writers", and Boer War Diary that was first published 40 years after his death.

== Performing ==
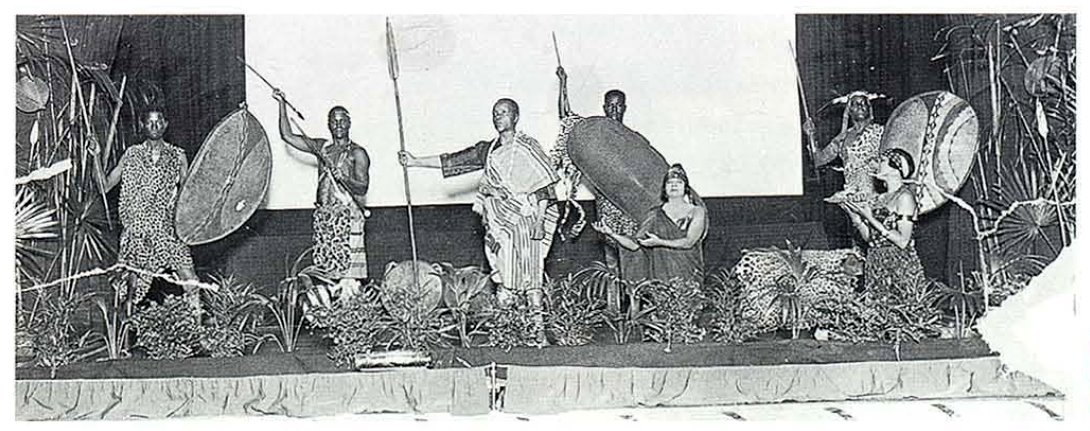
A scene from the stage show of Cradle of the World, 1923. Sol Plaatje is centre stage.

Plaatje made three visits to Britain. There he met many people of similar views. One was the cinema and theatrical impresario George Lattimore who in 1923 was promoting with Pathé, Cradle of the World, the "most marvellous and thrilling travel film ever screened". In a letter to the pan-Africanist W. E. B. Du Bois, Lattimore reported that he was having a "successful run" at the Philharmonic Hall in London. The show, which had the character of a revue, included live music and singing. Plaatje was recruited by Lattimore to take the role of an African tribesman.

Importantly, according to the SOAS University of London, this short-lived acting reflects a period of Plaatje's life where he was "desperately in need of money". Considering "Cradle of the World" and its simplistic depictions of indigenous culture, it is likely that Plaatje only would have participated if he desperately needed too. Plaatje, descended from the BaRong people of the Tswana-speaking nation; but was born and raised in a Lutheran Mission within the Orange Free State.

His recording of "Nkosi Sikelel' iAfrika" with Sylvia Colenso at the piano is believed to be the earliest extant recording of what would become the national anthem of South Africa.

== Personal life ==
Plaatje was a committed Christian, and organised a fellowship group called the Christian Brotherhood at Kimberley. He was married to Elizabeth Lilith M'belle. They had six children – Frederick York St Leger, (Note: Named after a well-known journalist and the proprietor of the Diamond Fields Advertiser, Frederick York St Leger) Halley, Richard, Violet, Olive and Johannes Gutenberg.

Plaatje's "Native Life" by some scholars has been described as displaying a paternalistic attitude towards women. One such chapter is 'Our Indebtedness to white women', which reflects notions of domesticity prevalent at the time. Nonetheless, challenging this view is The British Newspaper Archive's digitalisation of 'The International Woman Suffrage News'.

In July 1923, a 'Sol Plaatje, Esq' donated 4 shillings and 3 pence towards for the international suffragette cause. Notably, 1923 was a particularly bad time financially, yet Plaatje made this donation. While it is not clear why he made this donation, it does raise a few important questions regarding the tone in which "Our Indebtedness to White Women" forms.

White women played various important roles in his life. Firstly, Mrs Wilhelmine Westphal, who, upon her husband's increasing role in the Mission's governance, took a larger role in young Plaatje's tutoring. Secondly, Georgiana Solomon and Jane Cobden, interceded on Plaatje's behalf within the So-called Aborigines' Protection Society, to try and win him an audience, which triggered their expulsion. Thirdly, when he was writing "Native Life", Landlady Alice Timerberlake did not chase the cash-strapped Plaatje for rent, allowing him to prioritise raising funds to publish "Native Life".

Plaatje died of pneumonia at Pimville, Johannesburg, on 19 June 1932 aged 55, and was buried in Kimberley. Over a thousand people attended the funeral.

== Recognition and legacy ==
- 1935: three years after his death, a tombstone was erected over Plaatje's grave with the inscription: "I Khutse Morolong: Modiredi Wa Afrika – Rest in Peace Morolong, You Servant of Africa".

Decades passed before Plaatje began to receive recognition. "Much of what he strove for came to nought," writes his biographer Brian Willan; "his political career was gradually forgotten, his manuscripts were lost or destroyed, his published books largely unread. His novel Mhudi formed part of no literary tradition, and was long regarded as little more than a curiosity."

- 1970s: interest was stirred in Plaatje's journalistic and literary legacy through the work of John Comaroff (who edited for publication The Boer War Diary of Sol T. Plaatje, and by Tim Couzens and Stephen Gray (who focused attention on Sol Plaatje's novel, Mhudi)
- 1978: Mhudi was re-published under the editorial guidance of Stephen Gray
- 1982: Plaatje's Native Life in South Africa: Before and Since the European War and the Boer Rebellion (1916) was re-published by Ravan Press.
- 1982: the African Writers Association instituted a Sol Plaatje Prose Award (alongside the H. I. E. and R. R. R. Dhlomo Drama Award and the S. E. K. Mqhayi Poetry Award).
- 1984: Brian Willan published his biography, Sol Plaatje: South African Nationalist, 1876–1932.
- 1991: The Sol Plaatje Educational Trust and Museum, housed in Plaatje's Kimberley home at 32 Angel Street, was opened, actively furthering his written legacy.
- 1992: the house at 32 Angel Street in Kimberley, where Plaatje spent his last years, was declared a national monument (now a provincial heritage site). It continues as the Sol Plaatje Museum and Library, run by the Sol Plaatje Educational Trust, with donor funding. In the 2000s the Sol Plaatje Educational Trust has published Plaatje biographies by Maureen Rall and Sabata-Mpho Mokae.
- circa 1995: the Sol Plaatje Municipality (Kimberley) in South Africa's Northern Cape Province was named in Plaatje's honour.
- 1996: Sol Plaatje: Selected writings, ed. Brian Willan, is published by the University of Witwatersrand Press.
- 1998: an honorary doctorate was posthumously conferred on Plaatje by the University of the North-West, with several of his descendants present.
- 1998: Plaatje's grave in West End Cemetery, Kimberley, was declared a national monument (now a provincial heritage site). It was only the second grave in South African history to be awarded national monument status.
- 2000: The Diamond Fields Advertiser launches the Sol T Plaatje Memorial Award to honour the top Setswana and top English matriculant each year in the Northern Cape. The first recipients are Claire Reddie (English) and Neo Molefi (Setswana).
- 2000: the Department of Education building in Pretoria was renamed Sol Plaatje House, on 15 June 2000, "in honour of this political giant and consummate educator."

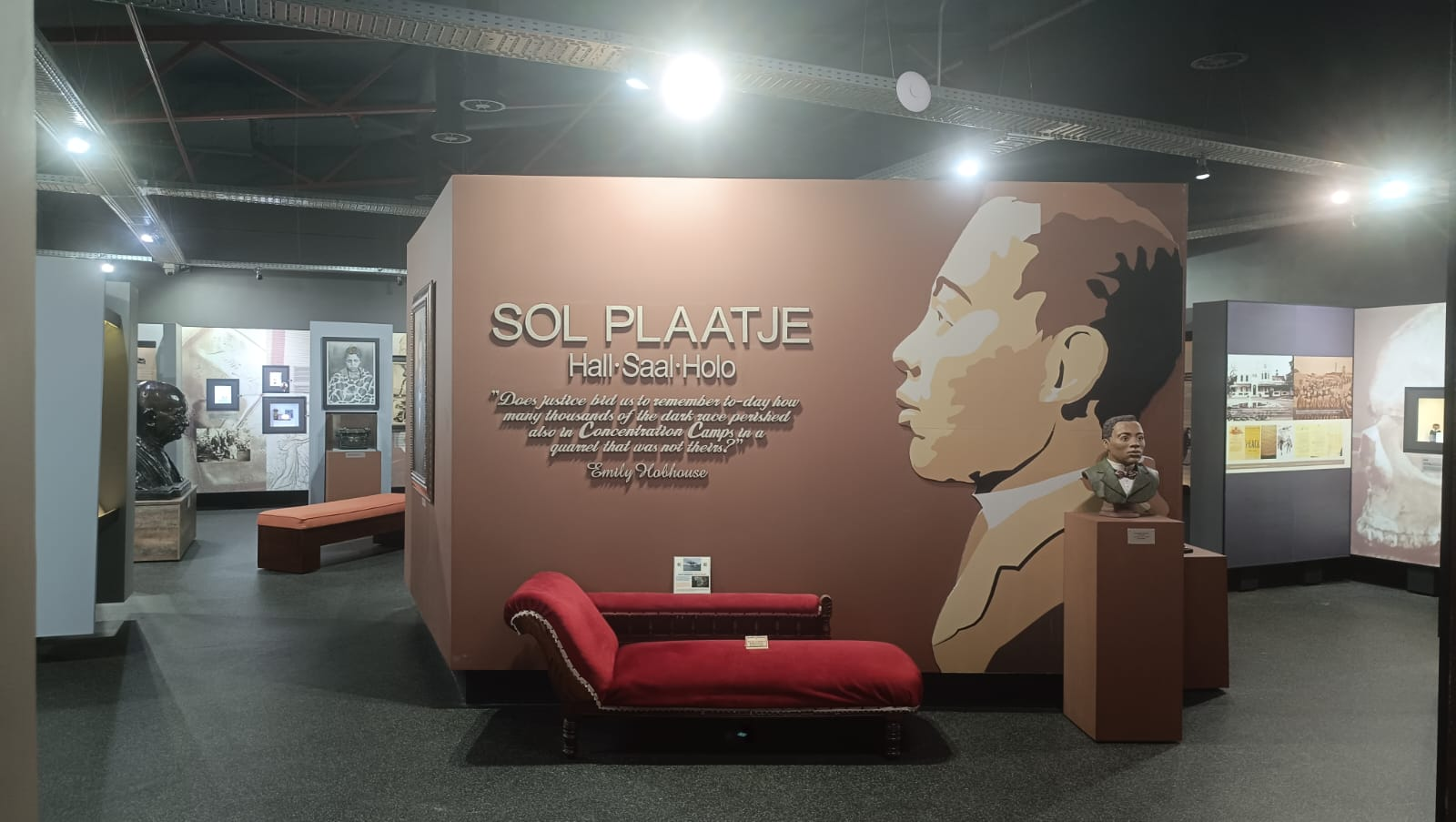
Sol Plaatje Hall at the Anglo-Boer War Museum in Bloemfontein

.

- 2000: the South African Post Office issued a series of stamps featuring writers of the Boer War, with Plaatje appearing on the 1.30 Rand stamp. The series also includes Sir Arthur Conan Doyle, Winston Churchill, Johanna Brandt and the Anglo-Boer War Medal.
- 2000: the African National Congress initiated the Sol Plaatje Award, one of a number of annual achievement awards. The Sol Plaatje Award recognises the best performing ANC branch.
- 2002: the Sol Plaatje Media Leadership Institute was established within Rhodes University's Department of Journalism and Media Studies.
- 2004: Order of Luthuli in gold
- 2005: the Saulspoort Dam was renamed Sol Plaatje Dam, although not in honour of Sol Plaatje the man but in remembrance of 41 Sol Plaatje Municipal workers drowned in a bus disaster there on 1 May 2003.
- 2007: the Sol Plaatje Prize for Translation was instituted by the English Academy of South Africa, awarded bi-annually for translation of prose or poetry into English from any of the other South African official languages.
- 2009: the Sol Plaatje Power Station at the Sol Plaatje Dam near Bethlehem, Free State was commissioned – the first commercial small hydro power station constructed in South Africa in 22 years.
- 2009: Sol Plaatje was honoured in the Posthumous Literary Award given by the South African Literary Awards.
- 2010: the first Plaatje Festival, held in Mahikeng, hosted by the North West Province Departments of Sport, Arts and Culture and of Education, on 5 and 6 November 2010. It brought together Plaatje and Molema descendants, poets, journalists, scholars, language practitioners, educators, and learners, who "paid tribute to this brilliant Setswana man of letters."
- 2010: a statue of Sol Plaatje, seated and writing at a desk, was unveiled in Kimberley by South African President Jacob Zuma on 9 January 2010, the 98th anniversary of the founding of the African National Congress. By sculptor Johan Moolman, it was erected at Kimberley's Civic Centre, formerly the Malay Camp, and situated approximately where Plaatje had his printing press in 1910 – 13.
- 2011: the European Union Sol Plaatje Poetry Competition was inaugurated, honouring "the spirit of the legendary intellectual giant, Sol Plaatje, the activist, linguist and translator, novelist, journalist and leader." Winners' work has been published in an annual anthology since the competition's inauguration.
- 2012: Seetsele Modiri Molema's Lover of his people: a biography of Sol Plaatje was published. Translated and edited by D. S. Matjila and Karen Haire, the manuscript, Sol T. Plaatje: Morata Wabo, dating from the 1960s, was the first Plaatje biography written in his mother tongue, Setswana, and the only book-length biography written by someone who actually knew Plaatje.
- 2013: the naming of the Sol Plaatje University in Kimberley, which opened in 2014, was announced by President Jacob Zuma on 25 July 2013.
- 2013: the renaming of UNISA's Florida Campus Library as the Sol Plaatje Library, unveiled on 30 July 2013.
- Schools in Kimberley and Mahikeng are named after Sol Plaatje.
- 2015: Anglo-Boer War Museum opens a new addition to the museum named; The Sol Plaatje Hall, ddedicated to the role of black and coloured people on both the British and Boer sides during the Second Boer War.
- 2016: Sol Plaatje's Native Life in South Africa: Past and Present by Brian Willan, Janet Remmington and Bhekizizwe Peterson is published by Wits University Press and goes on to win 'Best Non-Fiction Edited Volume' in the 2018 NIHSS Awards.
- 2018: Sol Plaatje: A life of Solomon Tshekisho Plaatje 1876 – 1932 by Brian Willan is published by Jacana Media and goes on to win 'Best Non-Fiction Biography' in the 2020 NIHSS Awards.
- 2020: Sol Plaatje’s Mhudi: History, Criticism, Celebration, a collection of essays edited by Sabata-Mpho Mokae and Brian Willan is published by Jacana Media.

== Original writing ==
- The Boer War Diary of Sol T. Plaatje: an African at Mafeking. Macmillan. 1973. ISBN 978-0-86954-002-2. with John L. Comaroff
- The Essential Interpreter (circa 1909): an essay
- Mhudi, an epic of South African native life a hundred years ago. Negro Universities Press. 1930. ISBN 9780837129303.
- Native Life in South Africa. London: P. S. King and Son Ltd. 1916. ISBN 978-3-8491-6441-6.
- Sechuana Proverbs, with Literal Translations and Their European Equivalents,... by Solomon T. Plaatje,... K. Paul, Trench, Trubner and Company. 1916.
- A Sechuana Reader in International Phonetic Orthography: (with English Translations). Arts & Culture Trust. 1916.
- Bantu Folk-Tales and Poems
- Willan, Brian, ed. (1996). Selected writings. Johannesburg: University of the Witwatersrand Press. ISBN 978-1-86814-303-0. ed. Brian Willan

== Translations of Shakespeare ==
- Dikhontsho tsa bo-Juliuse Kesara – Julius Caesar
- Diphosho-phosho – The Comedy of Errors

Both of these were called "remarkably good" translations in a 1949 study.

== Other relevant literature ==
- Couzens, T. J. (1971). "The Dark Side of the World: Sol Plaatje's Mhudi". English Studies in Africa. 14 (2): 187–203. doi:10.1080/00138397108690662. ISSN 0013-8398.
- Couzens, T. J. (1973). "Sol Plaatje's Mhudi". Journal of Commonwealth Literature. 8 (1): 1–19. doi:10.1177/002198947300800102. S2CID 220048537.
- Couzens, Tim. 1987. "Sol T. Plaatje and the First South African Epic". English in Africa 14: 41–65.
- Gray, Stephen (1976). Sources of the first black South African novel in English (PDF). Munger Africana Notes.
- Gray, Stephen (1977). "Sources of the first black South African novel in English". English in Africa. 4 (1). Grahamstown: Institute for the Study of English in Africa, Rhodes University: 1–6. JSTOR 40238385.
- Hellmann, Ellen; Abrahams, Leah, eds. (1949). Handbook on Race Relations in South Africa. Published for the South African Institute of Race Relations. Cape Town: Oxford University Press.
- Matjila, D. S. and K. Haire. 2004. Echoes of and affinities with Bogosi (kingship) in the works of Sol T. Plaatje. South African Journal of African Languages, Volume 34, 2014, Issue 1
- Midgley, Peter (1997). Sol Plaatje: An Introduction. Grahamstown: National English Literary Museum. ISBN 978-1-874941-12-5.
- Mokae, Sabata-mpho (2010). The Story of Sol T. Plaatje. Sol Plaatje Educational Trust. ISBN 978-0-9814236-3-0.
- Molema, S. M. (2012). D. S. Matjila & K. Haire (ed.). Lover of His People: A Biography of Sol Plaatje. ISBN 978-1-86814-601-7.
- Plaatje, Sol (Solomon Tshekisho) (1998). Native Life in South Africa. London: P. S. King and Son Ltd. ISBN 978-3-8491-6441-6.
- Rall, Maureen (2003). Peaceable Warrior: The Life and Times of Sol T. Plaatje. Sol Plaatje Educational Trust. ISBN 9780620292375.
- Van Wyk, Chris (2003). Sol Plaatje. Awareness Publishing. ISBN 978-1-919910-82-6.
- Willan, Brian (1984a). Sol Plaatje, South African Nationalist, 1876–1932. Berkeley and Los Angeles: University of California Press. ISBN 978-0-520-05334-2.
- Willan, Brian (1984b). Sol Plaatje: A Biography. Johannesburg: Ravan. ISBN 978-0-86975-252-4.
