= Philharmonie =

- Berliner Philharmonie
- Kölner Philharmonie
- Elbphilharmonie, Hamburg
- Jenaer Philharmonie
- Philharmonie im Gasteig, Munich
- Neue Philharmonie Frankfurt
- Philharmonie de Paris
- Philharmonie Luxembourg

== See also ==
- Philharmonic Hall (disambiguation)
