= Whitney–Farrington–Cook House =

Historic house in Massachusetts, United States

- U.S. National Register of Historic Places
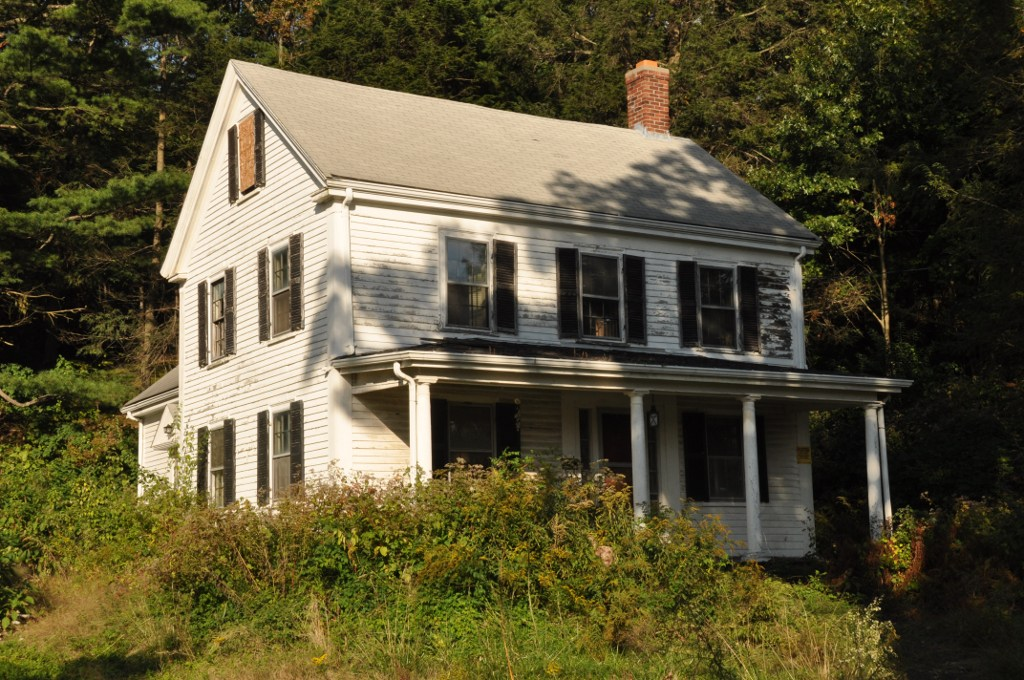

- Location within Massachusetts Location within the United States
- Location: 385 Trapelo Rd., Waltham, Massachusetts
- Coordinates: 42°23′54″N 71°12′40″W
- Built: 1858
- Architectural style: Italianate
- MPS: Waltham MRA
- NRHP reference No.: 89001510
- Added to NRHP: September 28, 1989

The Whitney–Farrington–Cook House was a historic house in Waltham, Massachusetts. The 2 1/2-story wood-frame house was built c. 1858, and was a good example of Italianate styling. It had a three-bay facade, with a single-story porch across the facade that was supported by Tuscan columns. The main entry was flanked by sidelights and simple pilasters, and topped with an entablature.

The house was listed on the National Register of Historic Places in 1989. It was demolished circa 2012.

== See also ==
- National Register of Historic Places listings in Waltham, Massachusetts
