= Will Marion Cook =

American composer and violinist (1869–1944)

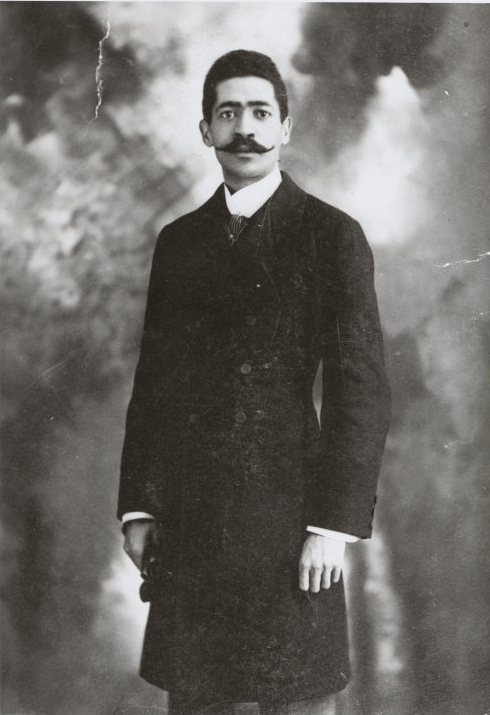
- Cook in 1910

Background information
- Born: William Mercer Cook; January 27, 1869; Washington, D.C., U.S.
- Died: July 19, 1944 (aged 75) Harlem, New York City

William Mercer Cook (January 27, 1869 – July 19, 1944), better known as Will Marion Cook, was an African-American composer, pianist, orchestrator, lyricist, violinist, and choral director. Cook was a student of Antonín Dvořák. In 1919 he took his New York Syncopated Orchestra (Southern Syncopated Orchestra) to England for a command performance for King George V of the United Kingdom, and tour. Cook is probably best known for his popular songs and landmark Broadway musicals, featuring African-American creators, producers, and casts, such as Clorindy, or The Origin of the Cake Walk (1898) and In Dahomey (1903). The latter toured for four years, including in the United Kingdom and United States.

Cook served as musical director of the George Walker-Bert Williams Company, working with the comedy partners on Clorindy, In Dahomey, and several other musical successes.

In 1944, Cook was diagnosed with pancreatic cancer and was transported to the Harlem Hospital in June 1944. He died 29 days later, July 19, at the age of 75. Cook's grave is to be found in Washington, D.C's Woodlawn Cemetery.

== Early life ==
Will Marion Cook (né William Mercer Cook) was born soon after the Civil War in 1869 in Washington, D.C., to John Hartwell Cook and his wife Isabel. The senior Cook had been in the first class of the Howard University School of Law, graduating in 1871 and becoming one of the first black lawyers to practice in Washington. He served as "chief clerk of the Freedmen's Bureau from 1867 until 1872 and as professor and dean of the Howard University Law School from 1876 until 1878." His parents were free people of color before the war, and stressed education; Cook had graduated from Oberlin College.

After John Cook died of tuberculosis in 1879, the widowed Isabel struggled to keep her family going. She eventually had to send all her three children away to live with other family. Will at age 10 had a violent altercation with a teacher who strapped him, and he was sent to live with his maternal grandparents in Chattanooga, Tennessee. They were former slaves who had bought their freedom before the war. With them he heard what he described as "real Negro melodies" and folk music, during what he would later call his "soul period". After a year, his grandfather returned Will to his mother, believing it best for Will not to be in the South. Washington, D.C., had a sizeable community of African Americans, many free before the war, and had developed an educated class.

Soon after being reunited with his mother, Will decided to be serious about his music. He started to study violin at Oberlin Conservatory in Ohio at age 14. Cook's musical talent was apparent at an early age. At Oberlin, he was a student of Frederick G. Doolittle, as well as Fenelon Rice, L. Celestia Wattles, and Calvin B. Cady. With help from members of the African-American community, his benefit recitals were sponsored in order to help him afford to study abroad.

From 1887 to 1889, Cook studied at the Berlin Hochschule für Musik, working with violinist Heinrich Jacobson; Jacobson served as Chairman of the Orchestral Instruments Department. Jacobson was a former student of Hungarian violinist Joseph Joachim, considered one of the supreme musicians of the age. Some accounts state that Cook studied abroad for nine years, but this has not been documented.

== Marriage ==
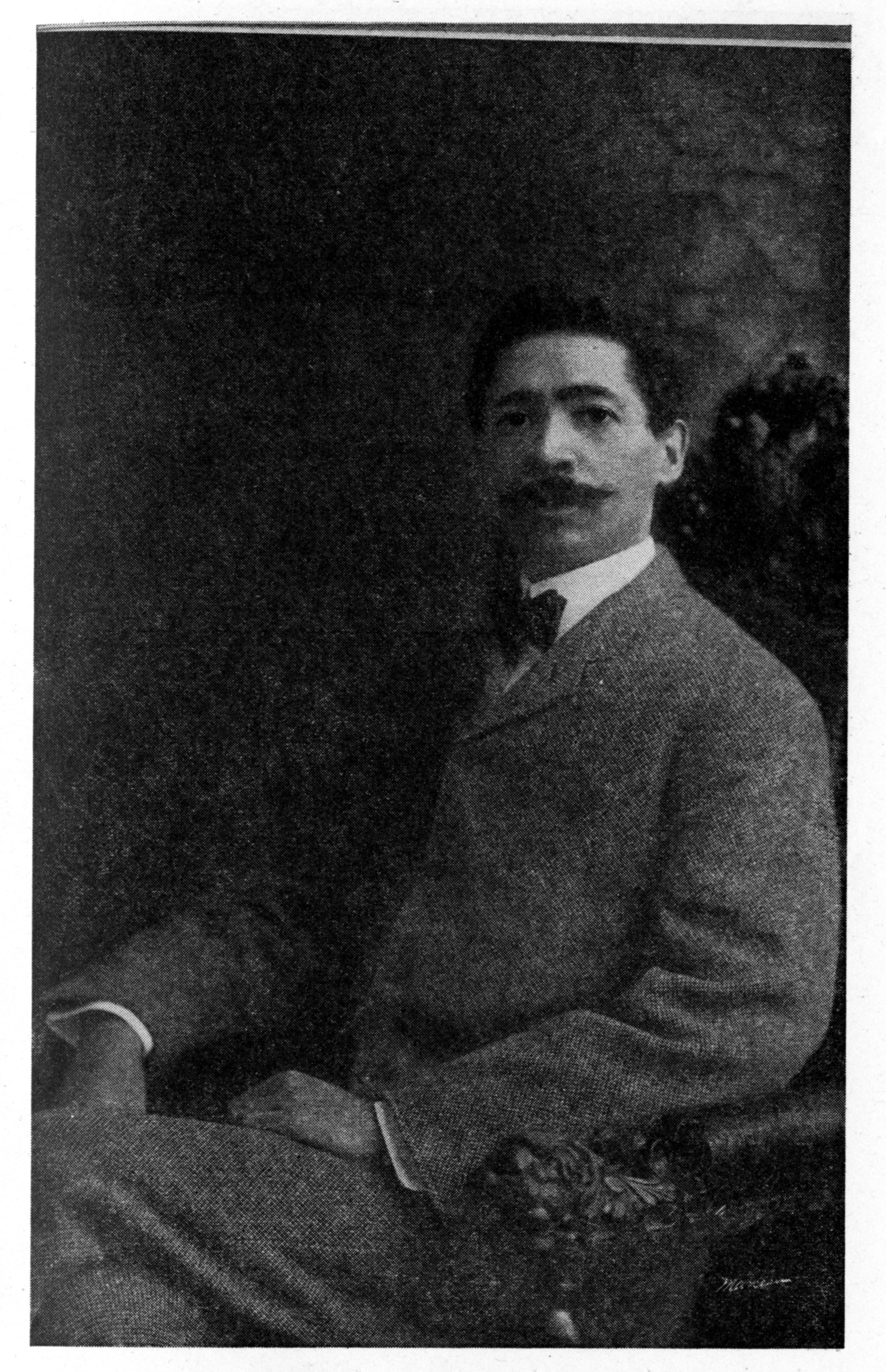
Will Marion Cook

In 1898 Cook married the young singer Abbie Mitchell; she was 14. They had a daughter, Marion Abigail Cook, in 1900, and a son, Will Mercer Cook, known as Mercer, in 1903. Their daughter was raised by family members as Mitchell herself had been. Marion later married dancer Louis Douglas. Will Mercer Cook became a professor of history at Howard University and later was appointed as United States Ambassador to Niger and Senegal.

== Studies with Dvořák ==
During 1894 and 1895, Cook studied with Czech composer Antonin Dvořák, who was working in the United States for a period, and John White at the National Conservatory of Music. Cook had performed professionally as a student and made his debut in 1889 in Washington, D.C. His performance career as a soloist was short-lived, however. Reacting to the stricter segregation of performers in the classical music community, Cook found a home in the musical theatre.

== Touring and composing ==
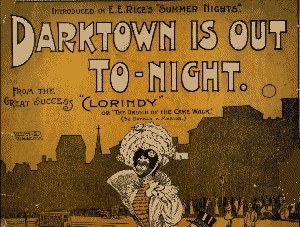
Playbill from 1898 showing Edward E. Rice's production of Cook's Clorindy, featuring the song "Darktown is Out Tonight"

In 1890, Cook became director of a chamber orchestra touring the East Coast. He prepared Scenes from the Opera of Uncle Tom's Cabin for performance. Cook aimed to showcase this work at the 1893 World's Columbian Exposition in Chicago, an event that became famous for its cultural and technological exhibitions. However, despite the anticipation surrounding the performance, the event was ultimately canceled. Despite this setback, the idea of Uncle Tom's Cabin as an opera remains an important chapter in the history of American music and its intersection with social issues. The cancellation of the performance, however, meant that Cook's adaptation of the opera was never widely heard.

He gained a production in 1898 of his Clorindy: The Origin of the Cakewalk, a one-act musical comedy created in collaboration with poet Paul Laurence Dunbar. The Cakewalk, a dance originating from enslaved African Americans as a satirical mimicry of European ballroom styles, became a central feature of Cook's work on In Dahomey. Symbolizing cultural resistance and reclamation. It was the first all-black show to play at a prestigious Broadway house; it was staged on the Roof Garden of the Casino Theatre. Because it was not staged in the theatre, and was not a full-length production, it does not have the landmark status of Cook's 1903 musical In Dahomey (see next paragraph).

After this period, Cook served as composer-in-chief and musical director for the George Walker-Bert Williams Company, an African-American agency started by two top vaudeville comedians who had been performing together for a decade.

As Cook continued to compose, he also produced many successful musicals. Chief among them was In Dahomey: (1903). This is generally considered Cook's landmark show, which was developed with Williams & Walker, who starred in it. J. A. Shipp wrote the book, and poet Paul Laurence Dunbar the lyrics. Theatre historian Gerald Bordman says that this is "the first full-length musical written and played by blacks to be performed at a major Broadway house." It was also notable for featuring the two leading vaudeville performers of the day, and for satirically addressing elements of African-American and US history, developing its characters well beyond the stereotypes of the day. After its opening, the musical was taken on tour to the United Kingdom. It returned in a revival in New York in 1904, and then toured the United States as well.

Best known for his songs, Cook used folk elements in an original and distinct manner. Many of these songs were first performed in his musicals. The songs were written for choral groups or for solo singers. Some were published in A Collection of Negro Songs (1912). Later in his career, Cook was an active choral and orchestral conductor. He produced several concerts such as "The New World" in 1917 and "The Southern Syncopated Orchestra" in 1920.

He also organized many choral societies in both New York City and in Washington, D.C. The New York Syncopated Orchestra, which he founded, toured the United States in 1918 and went to England in 1919 for a command performance for King George V. Known also as the Southern Syncopated Orchestra, it sought to bring jazz and ragtime to other countries and toured in England and Europe. Among his company were assistant director Will Tyers, jazz clarinetist Sidney Bechet, and Cook's wife, Abbie Mitchell. Cook also mentored younger musicians, such as Eubie Blake and Duke Ellington, who became renowned in successful careers of their own.

One of his last shows was Swing Along (1929), written with Will Vodery.

== Modern educational influence ==
Will Marion Cook's profound influence on modern education is examined by Daphne Brooks work, Bodies in Dissent. Cook's artistic innovations blending African American musical traditions with European classical forms, offer educators a rich lens through which to explore themes of cultural resistance. Brook emphasizes how Cook's achievements, such as his work on In Dahomey, challenge students to rethink the historical narrative of American theater and music, recognizing the pivotal role of Black artistry in shaping these fields. His insistence on presenting authentic Black experiences and rejecting stereotypes provides a powerful case study in using arts as a tool for social commentary. In educational contexts, Cook's legacy inspires critical discussions about representation, equity, and the power of creative expression, encouraging students to consider how historical figures like Cook continue to influence cultural discourse and inspire movements for justice and inclusion today.

== Legacy and honors ==
- The Will Marion Cook House on Striver's Row in Harlem, New York is a National Historic Landmark
- Produced In Dahomey the first full length Broadway musical written and performed by African Americans.
- His family house in Washington, D.C., was replaced by a building of Howard University. The site is marked and is recognized by Washington, D.C., on its African-American Heritage Trail.

== Notable works ==
- Abyssinia (1906), Broadway musical
- Bandanna Land (1907)
- Clorindy: The Origin of the Cakewalk (1898), a one-act musical, produced at the Roof Garden
- In Dahomey: A Negro Musical Comedy (1903), the first full-length, all-black musical produced at a major Broadway theater
- In Darkeydom (1914), with James Reese Europe
- Rain Song: Exhortation—A Negro Sermon (1912)
- Swing Along (1929), Will Vodery
- The Policy Players (1900)
- The Casino Girl (1900)
- The Cannibal King (1901), with Will Accooe
- The Southerners (1904), a Broadway musical
- The Ghost Ship (1907)
- The Traitor (1913)
- The Cannibal King (1914)
- Uncle Eph's Christmas (1901), a Broadway musical

== See also ==
- African-American music
- African American musical theater
- George Lattimore
- Will Marion Cook House
