= Clorindy, or The Origin of the Cake Walk =

1898 musical

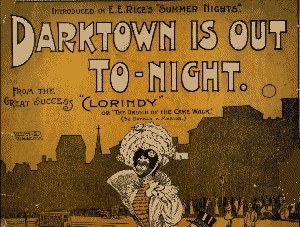
- Playbill from 1898 showing Edward E. Rice's Production of Clorindy featuring the song "Darktown is Out Tonight"
- Music: Will Marion Cook
- Lyrics: Paul Laurence Dunbar
- Premiere: July 4, 1898: Casino Theatre, New York City
- Productions: 1898 Broadway

Clorindy, or The Origin of the Cake Walk is a one-act musical by composer Will Marion Cook and librettist Paul Laurence Dunbar.

The piece premiered in 1898 and was the first Broadway musical with an all-black cast. It starred the famous African-American performer Ernest Hogan. Popular songs from the show included "Who Dat Say Chicken In Dis Crowd" (one of the first documented uses of the well-known "Who Dat?" comedy motif) and the finale, "Darktown Is Out Tonight".

== Development ==
Despite his traditional musical education in music schools in Europe and America, Cook believed that "Negroes should eschew white patterns" and work to create unique styles to reflect their unique culture, rather than imitating the music of whites. Cook dreamed of presenting the first musical play with an all black cast on Broadway. Encouraged by the vaudeville duo Bert Williams and George Walker, Cook recruited his friend, poet Paul Laurence Dunbar, to write the book and lyrics for the new show. The duo completed the music and lyrics for the production in a single night in a basement near Howard University "equipped with beer, whiskey, a T-bone steak, but no piano." Dunbar found the collaboration so unpleasant that he vowed never to work with Cook again, but the two nonetheless collaborated on several more productions, including 1903's In Dahomey.

== Songs ==
- Darktown is Out To-night
- Love in a Cottage is Best
- Dance Creole (or Creole Dance)
- Who Dat Say Chicken in Dis Crowd
- Hottest Coon in Dixie
- Jump Back

== Productions ==
Cook sought a producer and venue in New York. He met much rejection before bringing his cast uninvited to a rehearsal hall where he heard that another act was auditioning for Edward E. Rice, manager of the Casino Theatre's Roof Garden. Rice eventually agreed to present it. The musical was adapted for the venue, with Rice removing most of Dunbar's dialogue, as the rooftop setting made spoken dialogue difficult to understand over the noise from the street. Clorindy was first presented on July 4, 1898 as an afterpiece to Rice's production Summer Nights, and it was a hit, prompting Cook to boast that "My chorus sang like Russians, dancing meanwhile like Negroes, and cakewalking like angels, black angels!" He declared that "Negroes are at last on Broadway, and here to stay!"

Clorindy had a brief run, also starring Hogan, at the Boston Music Hall in mid-January, 1901.

Cook would later write the first Broadway musical with an integrated cast, The Southerners, in 1904.
