= Unzicker–Cook House =

Historic house in Ohio, United States

- Unzicke–Cook House
- U.S. National Register of Historic Places
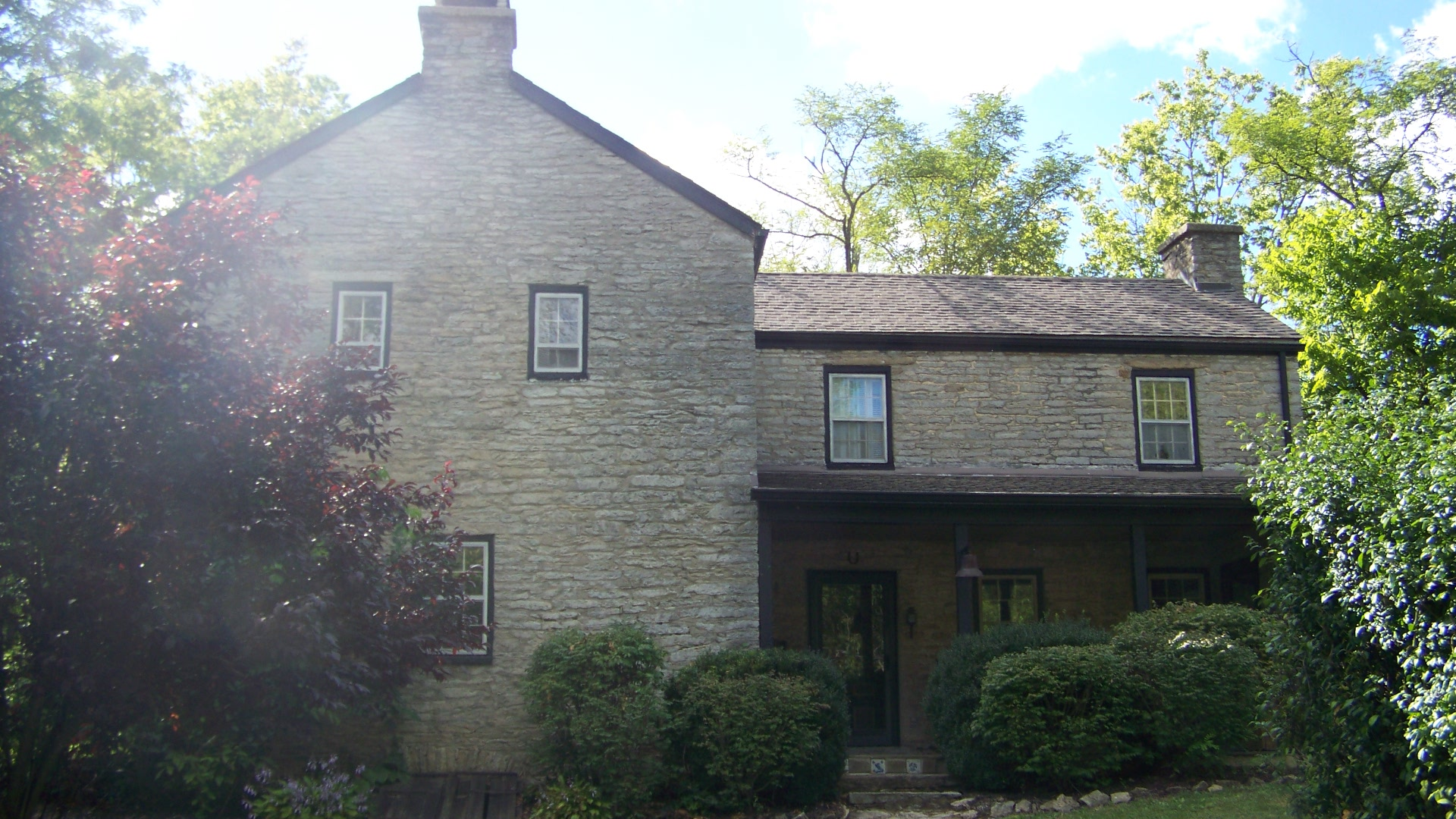

- Location within Ohio Location within the United States
- Nearest city: Oxford, Ohio
- Coordinates: 39°31′59″N 84°39′27″W
- NRHP reference No.: 74001404
- Added to NRHP: 1974-07-24

Unzicker–Cook House is a registered historic building near Oxford, Ohio, listed in the National Register on July 24, 1974.

== Historic uses ==
- Single dwelling
- Agricultural outbuildings
