= Urylee Leonardos =

American actress

- Urylee Leonardos, from a 1949 newsmagazine
- Born: May 14, 1910; Charleston, South Carolina, United States
- Died: April 25, 1986 (aged 75); New York City, United States
- Occupations: singer, actor
- Years active: 1939–1976
- Spouse: Kenneth Bacon

Urylee Leonardos (May 14, 1910 – April 25, 1986) was an American vocalist and actress who appeared frequently on Broadway. She has the distinction of being the first black performer to understudy and go on for a Latina in a Broadway production. She filled in for Yma Sumac in the role of Princess Najla in the 1951 production of Flahooley.

== Biography ==
Leonardos appeared in Mike Todd's Gay New Orleans revue at the 1939 World's Fair in New York City. Later that year, she had a small role on Broadway in The Male Animal.

Her big break came in 1943, when she was cast in the musical Carmen Jones. Initially cast in a small role, Leonardos took over the lead in the 1946 revival of the production.

Leonardos filled in for Yma Sumac as Princess Najla in the 1951 production, Flahooley. It was the first time that a black performer stepped into a role played by a Latina on Broadway. She also played the female lead in the 1953 revival of Porgy and Bess.

== Selected credits ==
=== Theatre ===
Year	Production	Role(s)	Theatre(s)	Notes
1956	Bells Are Ringing	Ensemble	Sam S. Shubert Theatre	
1953	Porgy and Bess	Bess	Ziegfeld Theatre	Revival. Alternated role with Leontyne Price
1952	Shuffle Along	Laura Popham	Broadway Theatre	Revival of the 1920s musical, but set in Northern Italy and New York City in 1945
1951	Flahooley	Switchboard Operator, Singer, Najla (understudy)	Broadhurst Theatre	
1948	Set My People Free	Blanche	Hudson Theatre	Staged by Martin Ritt
1946	Carmen Jones	Carmen	City Center	Revival of 1943 production
1943	Carmen Jones	Card Player, Ensemble	Broadway Theatre	

=== Motion Pictures ===
Year	Title	Role	Distributor	Notes
1950	No Sad Songs for Me	Flora, the Maid	Columbia	
