= Clarence H. Cooke House =

Historic house in Hawaii, United States

- U.S. National Register of Historic Places
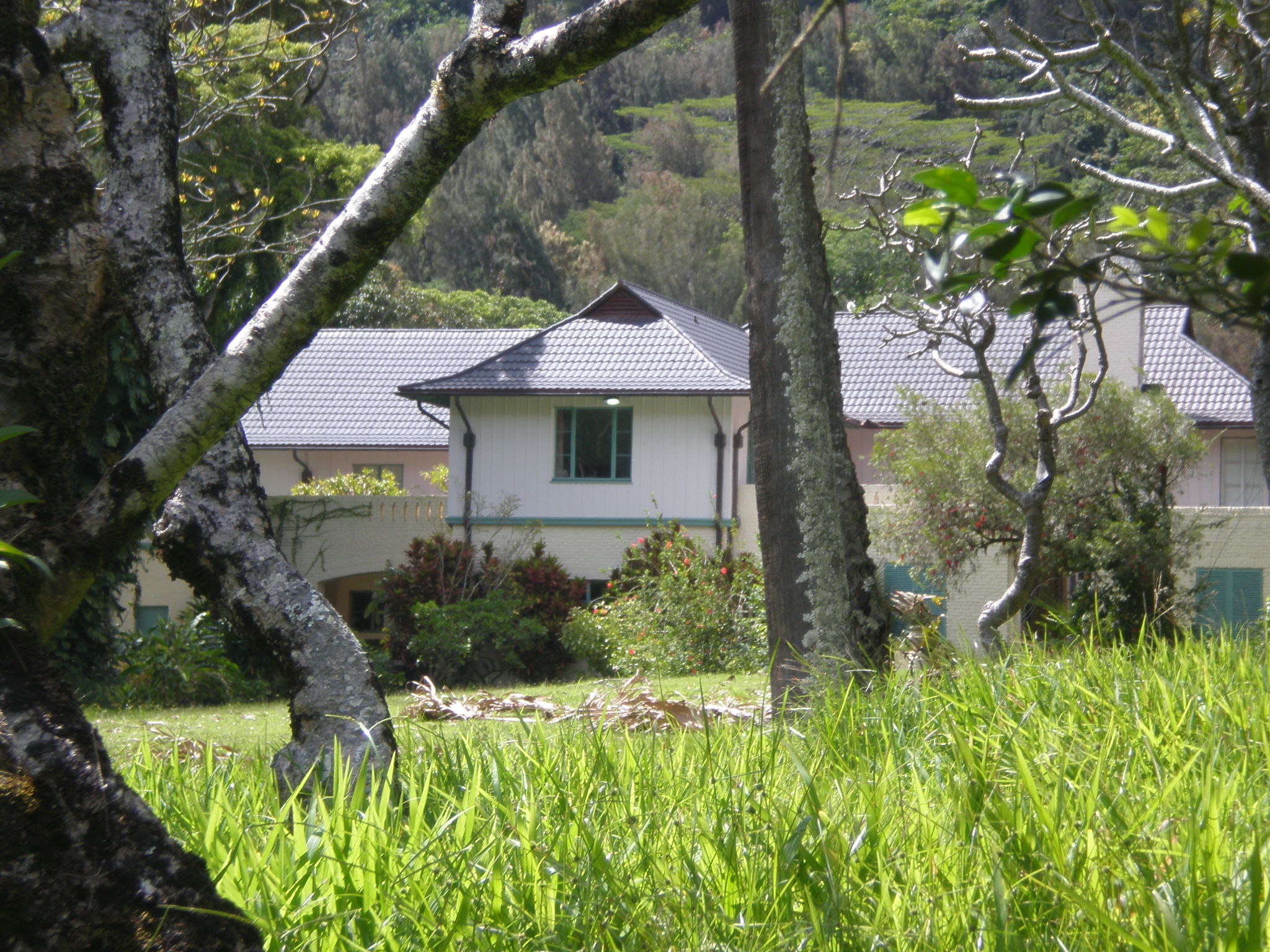
- View from Old Pali Road in 2009

- Location within Hawaii
- Location: 3860 Old Pali Road, Honolulu, Hawaii
- Coordinates: 21°20′53″N 157°49′33″W
- Area: house 4,741 sq. ft. lot 206,518 sq. ft.
- Built: 1932
- Architect: Hardie Phillip
- Architectural style: Hawaiian Regional Mediterranean Revival
- NRHP reference No.: 86001619
- Added to NRHP: 20 August 1986

The Clarence H. Cooke House, later known as the Marks Estate, at 3860 Old Pali Road, Honolulu, Hawaiʻi, was built for Clarence Hyde Cooke, the second son of Charles Montague Cooke and Anna Rice Cooke, heirs of the Castle & Cooke fortune. It was designed by the architect Hardie Phillip, built in 1929–32, and listed on the National Register of Historic Places in 1986 as a fine example of the upper-class, Hawaiian-style, great mansion of the late 1920s and early 1930s.

Phillip first worked in Honolulu as a member of the firm of Bertram Goodhue and Associates of New York City, who also designed the Honolulu Museum of Art on the site of the former home of Anna Rice Cooke, the C. Brewer Building downtown, and Lihiwai, the residence of Territorial Governor George R. Carter in Nuʻuanu Valley. For Clarence Cooke, Phillip designed a sprawling 24-room mansion fit for the lavish entertainment it became known for. Features of the evolving Hawaiian Regional style of the era include numerous lanai and open spaces, double-pitched hipped roof ("Dickey" roof), and lushly landscaped grounds. The two-story, whitewashed building is constructed of brick on the ground floor and board and batten on the upper floor. A porte cochere topped by an open lanai leads to a formal entry hall with staircase, which provides access to both floors of two wings running in opposite directions. There are also three guest cottages, a gatehouse, and a four-car garage with servants' quarters above, and a swimming pool with dressing rooms at the rear of the property. The pool area was earlier designed in Neoclassical style by Hart Wood.

Cooke left the estate to the Academy of Arts, which sold it in 1946 to Elizabeth Marks, the wealthy daughter of Lincoln L. McCandless. Her husband Lester Marks was a land commissioner for the Territory who resigned in 1949 when Governor Ingram M. Stainback decided to build a new Pali Highway up Nuʻuanu Valley, right through the middle of their estate. They sued to block the use of their land for the highway, but in 1956 the Territory finally bought the estate for $624,000. However, the Markses were allowed to live in their old home until 1976, when Mrs. Marks was evicted. By that time, she was a widow, but still wealthy enough to buy a new house at Black Point in Kahala.

State government departments then took it over, using it for office space, conferences, and special events. After trying to sell it for years, in 2002 the State finally auctioned off the property, which had been appraised at $4.5 million. The winning bid of $2.5 million came from Unity House Incorporated, a labor union nonprofit organization, which planned to use it for office space and a retiree activity center. In 2006, it was purchased by Douglas Himmelfarb, a Hawaii art and furniture dealer, for $4.41 million. During that time, much of the house was renovated and in 2010 was put up for sale at $9.9 million, then reduced to $8.5 million without finding a buyer. After Himmelfarb experienced financial difficulties, JPMorgan Chase Bank took possession of the property in 2014 for $6.5 million through a foreclosure. The home was eventually sold in late 2016 for $3.9 million. The home now is residence of Actress Alice Aoki.
