= Asa M. Cook House =

Historic house in Massachusetts, United States

- U.S. National Register of Historic Places
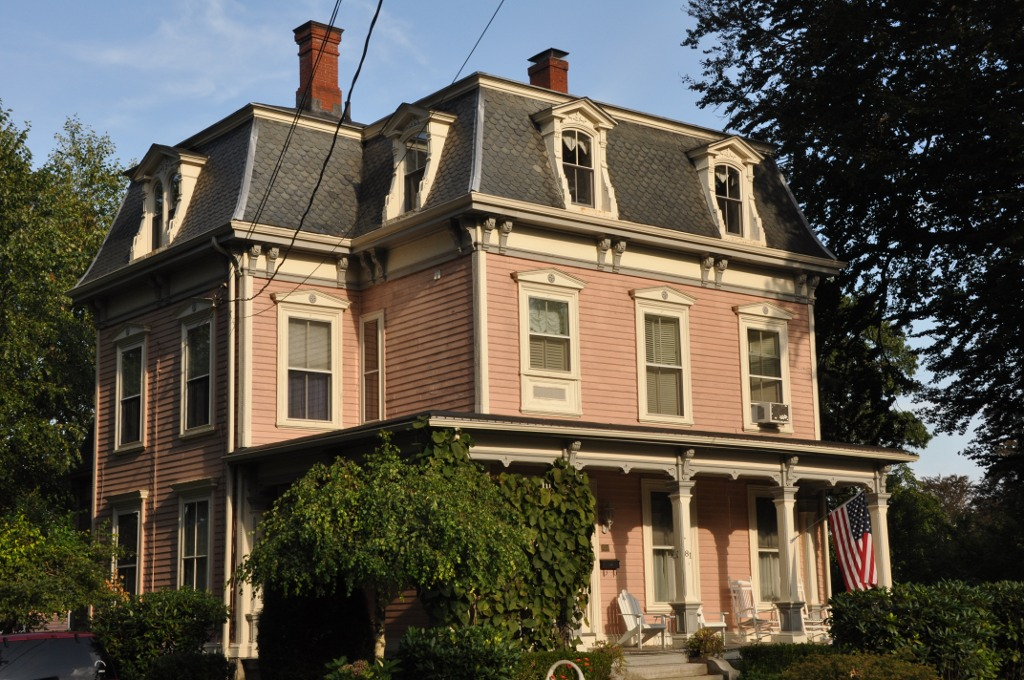

- Location within Massachusetts Location within the United States
- Location: 81 Prospect Street, Reading, Massachusetts
- Coordinates: 42°31′23.69″N 71°7′10.45″W
- Built: 1872
- Architectural style: Second Empire
- MPS: Reading MRA
- NRHP reference No.: 84002555
- Added to NRHP: July 19, 1984

The Asa M. Cook House is a historic house in Reading, Massachusetts. The 2 1/2-story wood-frame Second Empire house was built in 1872 for Asa M. Cook, an American Civil War veteran who commuted by train to a job at the United States custom house in Boston. The house is one of the most elaborately detailed of the style in Reading, with pedimented windows, rope-edge corner boards, and dormers with cut-out decoration in the mansard roof.

The house was added to the National Register of Historic Places in 1984.

== See also ==
- National Register of Historic Places listings in Reading, Massachusetts
- National Register of Historic Places listings in Middlesex County, Massachusetts
- 1st Massachusetts Battery - unit commanded by Cook
- 8th Massachusetts Battery - unit commanded by Cook
