= Philharmonic Hall, London =

Coordinates: 51.5189°N 0.1426°W

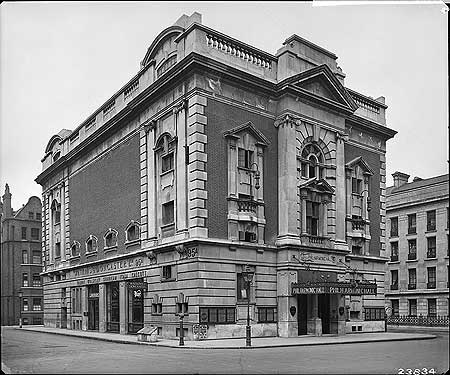
The Philharmonic Hall as it appeared in 1917

The Philharmonic Hall, 97 Great Portland Street, London, originally the St James's Hall, was built in 1907–08 to replace the St James's Hall that once stood in Regent Street. The building was then used by the BBC and known as Brock House. It is now leased to The Office Group.

== Location ==
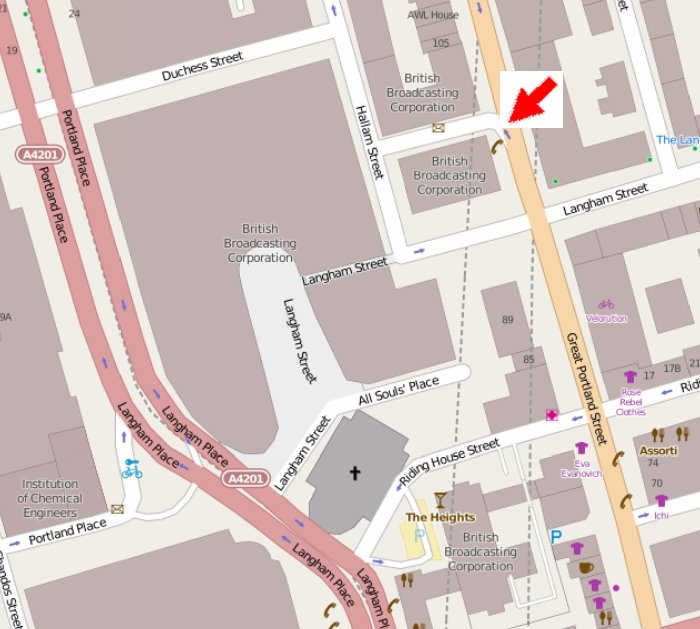
Location of the Philharmonic Hall/Brock House (arrowed)

The Hall occupies the whole of the area bounded by Langham Street, Hallam Street, Gildea Street and Great Portland Street. The building today has a street address of 19 Langham Street and the main entrance is now on the west side of the building in that street.

== History ==
The Philharmonic Hall was built on the site of the former St Paul's Church (once known as the Portland Chapel) to replace the St James's Hall in Regent Street which had been demolished in 1905. The foundation stone was laid by the Lord Mayor of London on 20 April 1907 and the building opened on 25 April 1908 with a series of promenade concerts performed by the newly formed St. James's Hall Orchestra.

By 1914, the hall had changed name to the Philharmonic and a Ward Lock guide to London produced soon after the end of the First World War (1918) reported that the hall was "mainly used for cinematograph displays".

In 1917, the hall was photographed for the Howard de Walden Estate of which it was then, and may still be, a part. The photograph shows that Intolerance was playing and that on the ground floor at number 95A was a car dealership by the name of Watkins and Doncaster Limited. Great Portland Street up to the Second World War was known as one of London's "Motor Row"s due to the over 30 car showrooms in the street.

== Events ==
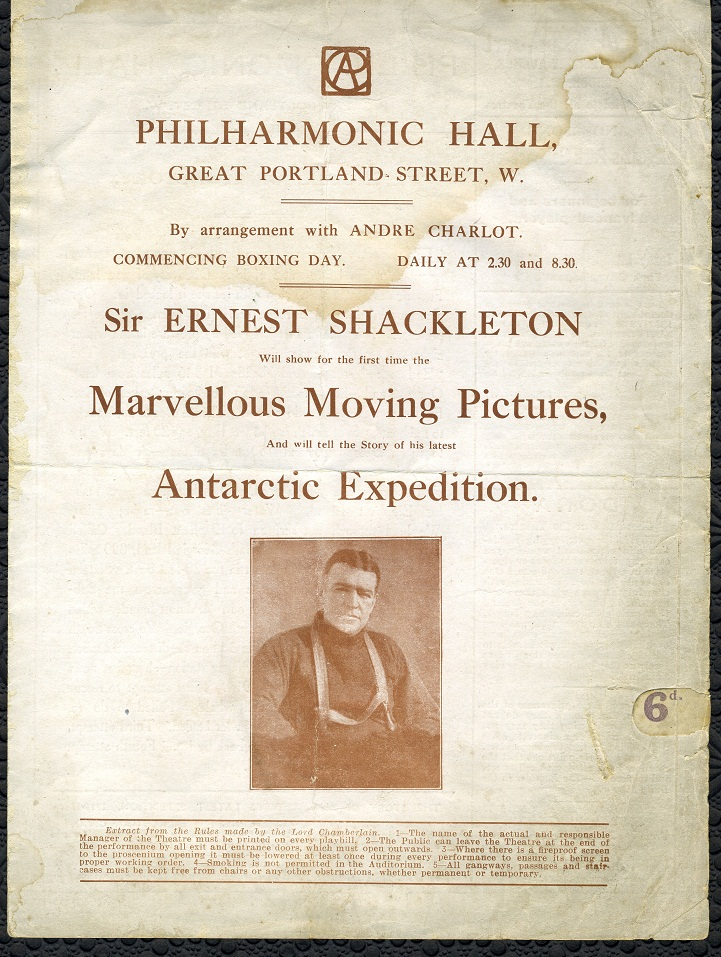
Programme for the film of Shackleton's Antarctic expedition

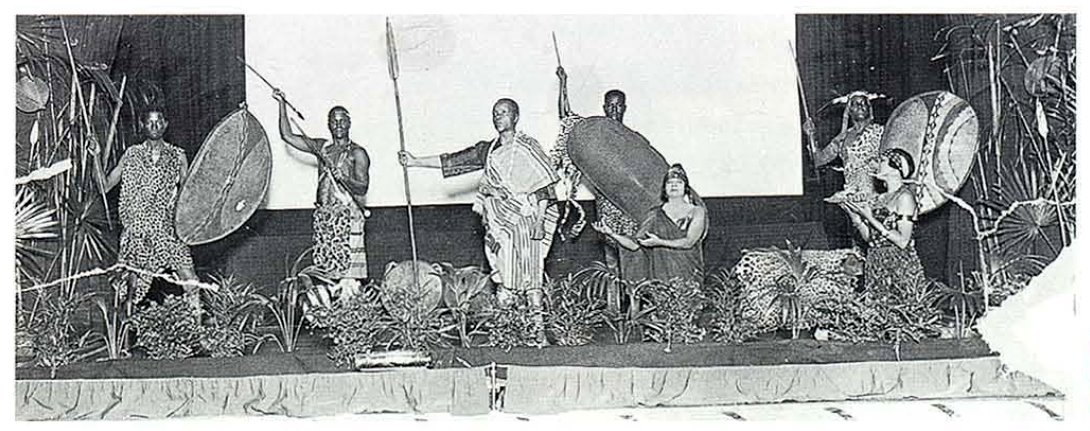
A scene from the stage show of Cradle of the World, 1923

The Hall presented a variety of material, including concerts and film, but developed a specialism in travel films from remote regions. Often, these were accompanied by a commentary or lecture from someone connected with the film.

- In 1919, the Southern Syncopated Orchestra, who are sometimes credited with introducing Jazz to Britain, performed at the hall. The orchestra had arrived in Britain earlier that year for a European tour and was a notable success at the Philharmonic Hall and elsewhere. They were complimented for their varied repertoire and performed for the Prince of Wales (later King Edward VIII) at Buckingham Palace.
- In March 1919, Herbert Ponting was "telling the story of" the film With Captain Scott in the Antarctic.
- Later in 1919, Lowell Thomas's film With Allenby in Palestine, was showing until the end of the year.
- The explorer, Ernest Shackleton, appeared there from December 1919 to May 1920 providing a commentary or lecture to accompany the silent film and slides of his expedition to Antarctica which had previously been shown at the Royal Albert Hall. The appearances were necessary to raise funds to pay for former and future expeditions. The event was advertised as much as a celebrity appearance as the showing of a named work as the slides and pieces of film exhibited had not yet received a name or an identity separate from Shackleton's words. The rent of the hall cost £200 per week and Shackleton employed two operators, one for slides and one for film, at £10 each per week.
- In 1922, documentary films titled Wildest Africa and Through Romantic India were shown.
- In 1923, George Lattimore was promoting with Pathé, Cradle of the World, the "most marvellous and thrilling travel film ever screened". In a letter to the pan-Africanist W.E. Du Bois, Lattimore reported that he was having a "successful run" at the Philharmonic Hall. In fact, the show received indifferent reviews and lasted only one month. The show, which seems to have been based at least partly on Wildest Africa, included a musical interlude to enliven the proceedings and to cover up the changing of the film reels. Sol Plaatje, the first General Secretary of the South African Native National Congress (later the African National Congress), who was desperately in need of money, was recruited by Lattimore to take the role of an African tribesman.

== BBC use ==
The Philharmonic Hall was one of more than twenty locations considered for the new headquarters of the British Broadcasting Corporation in 1927. The site was discounted as a headquarters and in 1932 the BBC's Broadcasting House was opened on the other side of Hallam Street. The Philharmonic Hall became a BBC building known as Brock House. The exterior is now much changed with a different facade and windows and additional space added on the roof.

During the Second World War, the building was the home of the BBC Radio drama department. In later years, the building was used mainly for administration and the BBC Mechanical Workshop. By 2018 the BBC vacated the building, with the original plan for it to be redeveloped as a boutique hotel. However, as of 2018, it is being developed into office space for The Office Group.

== See also ==
- Queen's Hall
