= Eleutheros Cooke House =

Eleutheros Cooke House may refer to:

- Eleutheros Cooke House (1415 Columbus Avenue, Sandusky, Ohio), listed on the NRHP in Erie County, Ohio
- Eleutheros Cooke House (410 Columbus Avenue, Sandusky, Ohio), also listed on the NRHP
