= William Cook House (Cambridge, Massachusetts) =

Historic house in Massachusetts, United States

- U.S. National Register of Historic Places
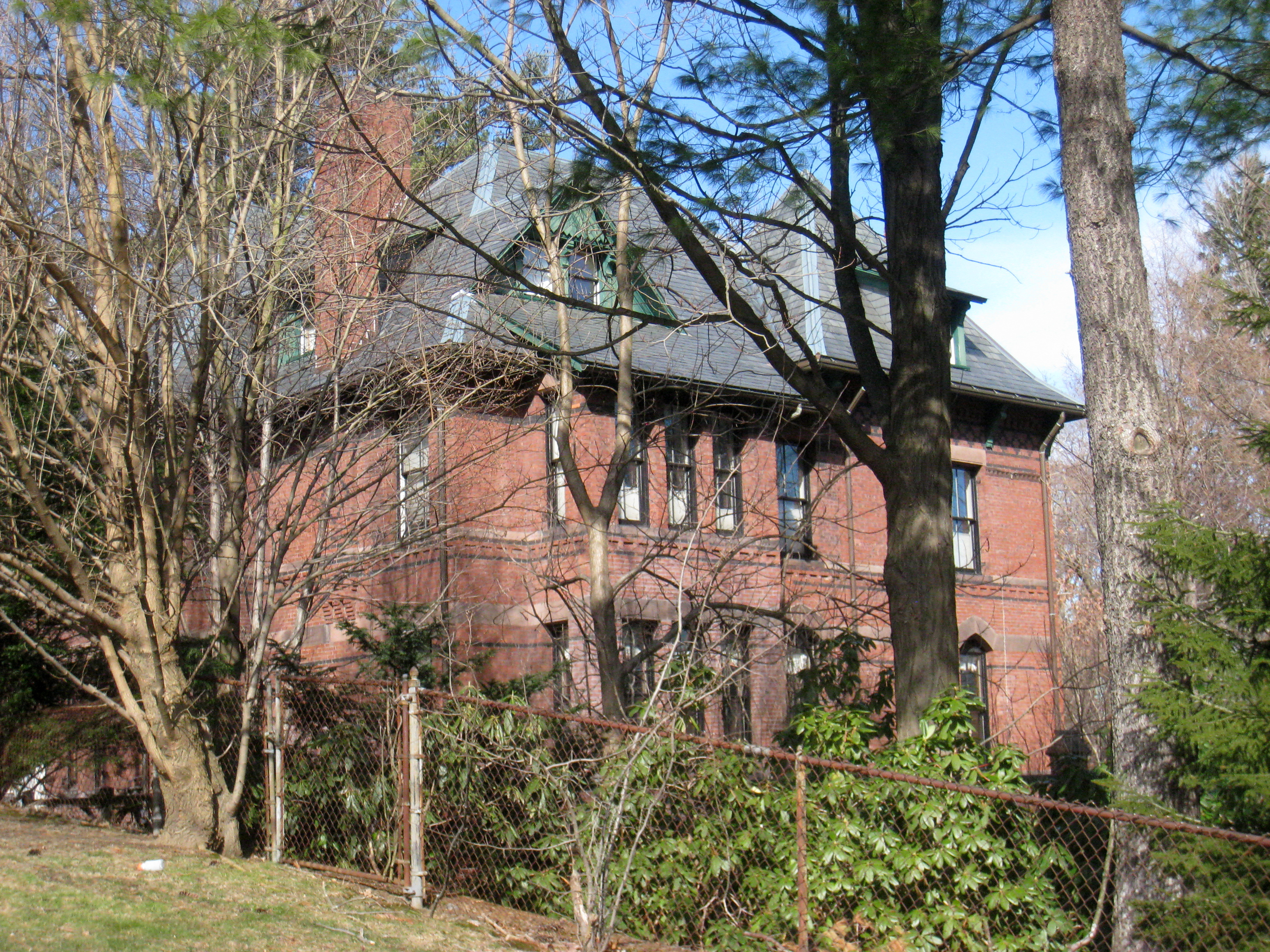

- Location within Massachusetts Location within the United States
- Location: Cambridge, Massachusetts
- Coordinates: 42°22′45″N 71°8′5″W
- Built: 1876
- Architect: Longfellow, W. P. P.
- Architectural style: Stick/Eastlake, Queen Anne
- MPS: Cambridge MRA
- NRHP reference No.: 82001934
- Added to NRHP: April 13, 1982

The William Cook House is an historic house at 71 Appleton Street in Cambridge, Massachusetts in the United States of America. The 2 1/2-story brick house was built in 1877, and is distinctive as a transitional Stick style/Queen Anne building executed using a rare construction material (brick) for a residence in Cambridge. Queen Anne styling is evident in the varied massing and gables, and in the polychrome brick surface. It also has an extremely well preserved Victorian interior.

The house was listed on the National Register of Historic Places in 1982.

== See also ==
- National Register of Historic Places listings in Cambridge, Massachusetts
