= Fox–Cook Farm =

- U.S. National Register of Historic Places
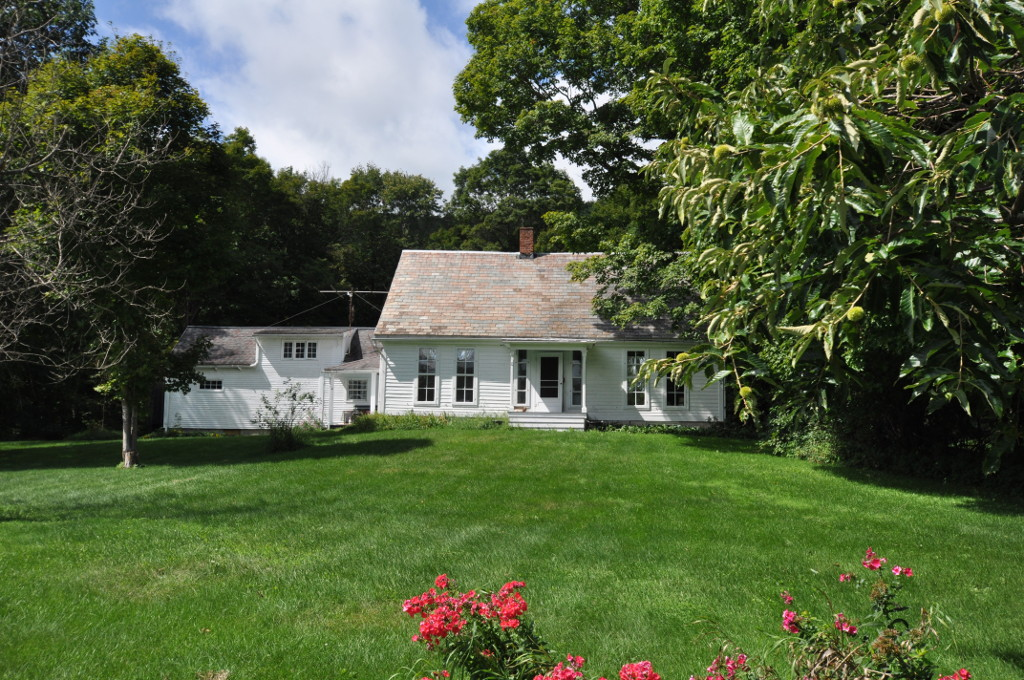

- Location within Vermont Location within the United States
- Location: Off US 7 on Cook Dr., Wallingford, Vermont
- Coordinates: 43°27′23″N 72°59′28″W
- Area: 5 acres (2.0 ha)
- Built: 1800
- MPS: Rural Otter Creek Valley MRA
- NRHP reference No.: 86003228
- Added to NRHP: November 26, 1986

The Fox–Cook Farm is a historic farm property on Cook Drive in Wallingford, Vermont. Established in the 1790s, it is one of the oldest surviving farmsteads in the Otter Creek valley south of Wallingford village. It includes a c. 1800 Cape style farmhouse and a c. 1850 barn, among other outbuildings. The property was listed on the National Register of Historic Places in 1986.

== Description and history ==
The Fox–Cook Farm stands at the end of Cook Drive, a spur road on the west side of United States Route 7 in southern Wallingford. The farm complex extends along the south side of Cook Drive, between the street and a ravine, with a cluster of outbuildings marking the end of the drive. The house is a 1 1/2-story Cape style wood-frame structure, five bays wide, with a gabled roof, central chimney, and rubblestone foundation. It is oriented facing east, with views of the Otter Creek valley. Its entrance is framed by sidelight windows, and sheltered by a flat-roof porch with turned posts. The front windows are elongated in the Greek Revival style. A single-story wing is set back and extending to the main block's left side. The c. 1850 barn is set downslope, to the east of the house, with most of the outbuildings further up the slope behind the house.

The farm was established in the 1790s by William Fox, who moved here from Tinmouth. Fox's heirs sold the farm in the 1820s, now with a house standing on the property, to Lincoln Andrews. It was acquired by the Cooks in 1913, and operated as a dairy farm into the 1940s. It is one of the oldest farmsteads identified by a 1980s survey of the Otter Creek valley in southern Wallingford.

== See also ==
- National Register of Historic Places listings in Rutland County, Vermont
