= William Cook House (Mebane, North Carolina) =

Historic house in North Carolina, United States

- U.S. National Register of Historic Places
- Location within North Carolina Location within the United States
- Location: NC 2131 W side at jct. with NC 2132, near Mebane, North Carolina
- Coordinates: 36°1′59″N 79°17′3″W
- Area: 1.5 acres (0.61 ha)
- Built: c. 1840, c. 1903
- Built by: Cook, William
- MPS: Log Buildings in Alamance County MPS
- NRHP reference No.: 93001194
- Added to NRHP: November 22, 1993

William Cook House is a set of two historic homes located near Mebane, Alamance County, North Carolina. They are a one-story one-room log house, built about 1840, and a two-story frame I-house built about 1903. They are set close to and at a 90-degree angle to each other. The houses are connected by joined·hip roofed porches, carried by plain square posts. Also on the property are the contributing two-story, single-pen log barn, a log storage shed, a frame corn crib, and a substantial log wood shed.

It was added to the National Register of Historic Places in 1993.
