= Thomas Cook House (Milwaukee, Wisconsin) =

Historic house in Wisconsin, United States

- U.S. National Register of Historic Places
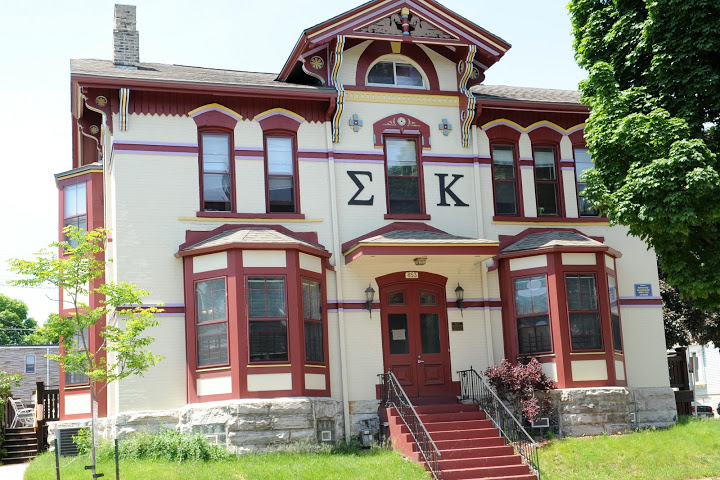
- After painting in 2011

- Location within Wisconsin Location within the United States
- Location: 853 N. Seventeenth St. Milwaukee, Wisconsin
- Coordinates: 43°2′29″N 87°56′3″W
- Built: 1875
- Architect: E. Townsend Mix
- Architectural style: Italianate
- NRHP reference No.: 86000104
- Added to NRHP: January 16, 1986

The Thomas Cook House is a High Victorian Italianate-styled house built in 1875 in Milwaukee, Wisconsin, United States, by pioneer stone merchant Cook. It was added to the National Register of Historic Places in 1986.

In 1853 Thomas Cook began a limestone quarry business, supplying building materials for local construction. In 1860 he and Edwin Hyde formed the Cook and Hyde Stone Company, which over the years supplied stone for the Mackie Building, the Plankinton House Hotel, St. Paul's Episcopal Church, the Milwaukee Club, the Milwaukee Central Library, and Forest Home Cemetery Chapel, among others. Many of these projects were designed by E. Townsend Mix.

Cook continued his association with Mix in this house, which he had built in 1875 as a double-house rental property. The building is 2.5 stories, on a foundation of rusticated block. Walls are cream brick. Some windows are topped with multi-colored arches, some are bays, one is lancet-arched. The roof is chalet-style, supported by scroll-sawn brackets and a sawtooth frieze board. The exterior has changed little from the time it was built.
