= Louis Douglas =

Louis Winston Douglas, sometimes spelled Douglass (May 14, 1889, Philadelphia - May 19, 1939, New York City) was an American dancer, choreographer, and music businessman.

Douglas toured Ireland with a children's revue in 1903 and then went on tour in Europe with Belle Davis from 1903 to 1908, and appears with her in the 1906 film Die schöne Davis mit ihren drei Negern. He branched into solo dancing from 1910, doing shows throughout the major European capitals, and toured South America in 1923.He and Miss Marion Cook starred in the revue "Tout Nue" at the Concert Mayol in Paris from March through September 1924. He was the star of the 1925 show La Revue nègre, which featured music by Claude Hopkins and his Charleston Jazz Band. In 1926 he organized and starred in Black People, with music by some of Sam Wooding's sidemen; the show toured Europe and North Africa. His shows in Berlin in 1926 and in New York in 1927 featured, at times, Sidney Bechet, Tommy Ladnier, Valaida Snow, and Juice Wilson. He toured Europe several times. Belgrade (Yugoslavia), Istanbul (Turkey), Athens (Greece), Alexandria and Cairo (Egypt) and Germany between February and May of 1927. He returned and toured Egypt, Athens (Greece), Istanbul (Turkey), Tirana (Albania), and Zagreb (Yugoslavia) from April to June of 1930. He can be seen as a dancer in the films Einbrecher (1930) and Niemandsland (1931), he had a leading acting role in the latter. Douglas choreographed revues at the Casino de Paris between 1933 and 1936, then did a final tour of Europe before returning to New York in 1937. There he starred in Eubie Blake and Andy Razaf's Tan Manhattan, then worked with James P. Johnson on the show Tan Town Topics. He and Johnson also worked on Policy Kings the following year.

Louis Douglas married the daughter of composer Will Marion Cook and singer Abbie Mitchell.
