= William H. Cook Water Tank House =

- U.S. National Register of Historic Places
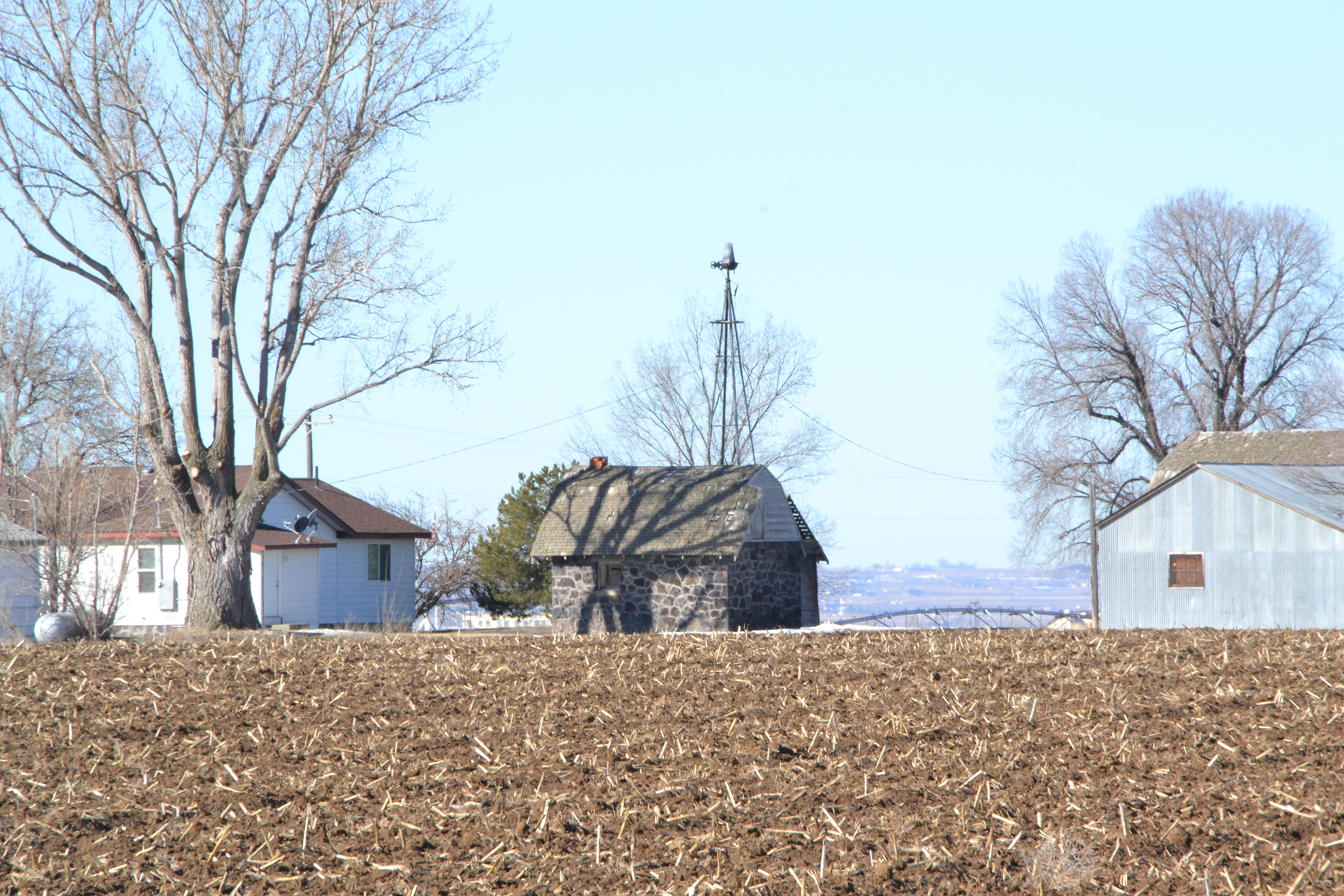

- Location within Idaho Location within the United States
- Nearest city: Jerome, Idaho
- Coordinates: 42°40′0″N 114°24′25″W
- Area: less than one acre
- Built: 1915
- MPS: Lava Rock Structures in South Central Idaho TR
- NRHP reference No.: 83004211
- Added to NRHP: September 8, 1983

The William H. Cook Water Tank House is a water tank house located southeast of Jerome, Idaho, United States. The building was constructed circa 1915 and was used to store water for William H. Cook's farm. The rectangular building was constructed with lava rock and contains a metal tank. Although the stone craftsmanship in the building is similar to the work of local stonemason H. T. Pugh, the builder of the house has not been determined.

The building was listed on the National Register of Historic Places on September 8, 1983.

== See also ==
- List of National Historic Landmarks in Idaho
- National Register of Historic Places listings in Jerome County, Idaho
