= Thomas Cook House (Somerville, Massachusetts) =

Historic house in Massachusetts, United States

- U.S. National Register of Historic Places
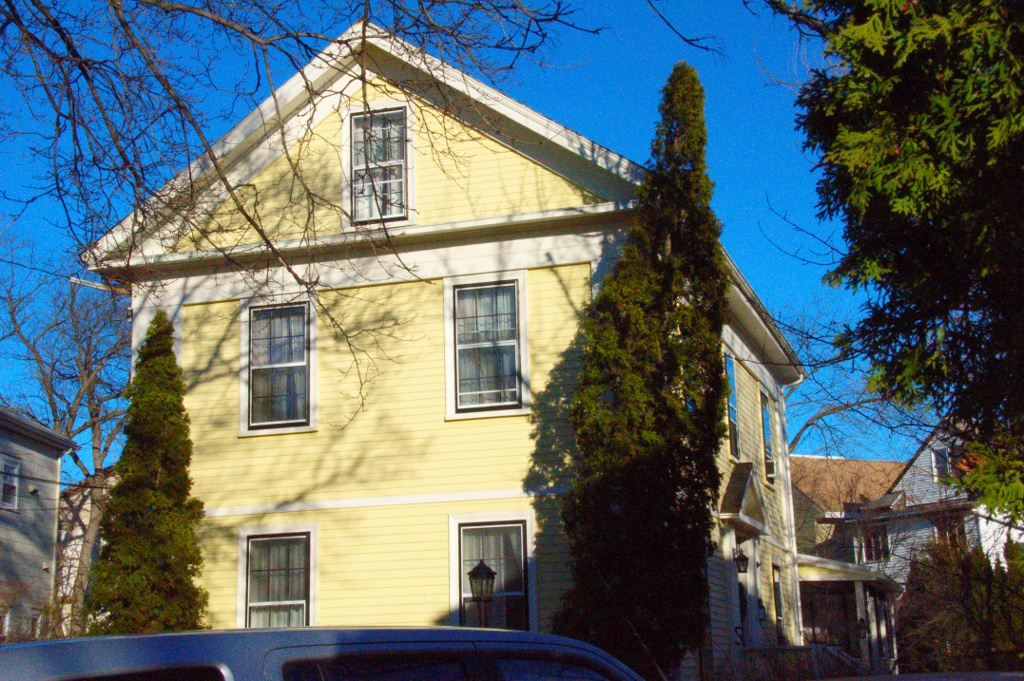
- The house in 2009

- Location within Massachusetts Location within the United States
- Location: 21 College Hill Rd., Somerville, Massachusetts
- Coordinates: 42°24′32″N 71°7′44″W
- Area: less than one acre
- Built: 1850
- Architectural style: Greek Revival
- MPS: Somerville MPS
- NRHP reference No.: 89001250
- Added to NRHP: September 18, 1989

The Thomas Cook House is a historic house in Somerville, Massachusetts. Built c. 1850, it is the only surviving Greek Revival farmhouse on the west side of the city, and a reminder of the area's agrarian past. It was listed on the National Register of Historic Places in 1989.

== Description and history ==
The Thomas Cook House stands in the dense residential area of northwestern Somerville. It stands on the north side of a bend in College Hill Road, a short side street between North Street and Conwell Avenue. It is a 2 1/2-story wood-frame structure, with a gabled roof and clapboarded exterior. The building corners have pilasters, which rise to a full entablature and fully pedimented gable ends. The main entrance is at the center of a side-facing three-bay facade, with a gabled pediment above. That pediment, and a finish strip between the first and second floors, are both later stylistic modifications to the house.

The house was built about 1850 by Thomas Cook, a local farmer. This area of West Somerville was principally used for market gardens, and did not see development pressure until well after Tufts University was established on land to the east in 1852. Beginning in the 1880s the area was subdivided for residential development. This house, originally facing North Street to the west, was moved to its present location, and the surrounding land was eventually built over with two and three-family houses.

== See also ==
- National Register of Historic Places listings in Somerville, Massachusetts
