= Cook Farm (Charles City, Iowa) =

- U.S. National Register of Historic Places
- Location within Iowa Location within the United States
- Location: South of Charles City on U.S. Route 218
- Coordinates: 43°01′51″N 92°38′41″W
- Area: 4 acres (1.6 ha)
- NRHP reference No.: 79000895
- Added to NRHP: June 18, 1979

The Cook Farm is a collection of historic domestic and agricultural buildings located south of Charles City, Iowa, United States. It was listed on the National Register of Historic Places in 1976. The historic designation includes a large house (c. 1860), a smaller house (c. 1855), and a barn, all constructed in locally quarried limestone. There are very few agricultural stone buildings in Iowa. The main house is the most sophisticated of the three. The two-story structure features dressed limestone blocks laid in a random ashlar pattern, a front-gable main block, and a single-story dining/kitchen wing. The older house is a single-story structure composed of rubble stone. The barn's westernmost section has a unique cube shape.

The O'Hair family acquired the property in the early 1850s and built the smaller house and the first two sections of the barn. Elizabeth Strawn, two times a widow, moved her family to the farm around 1860. She had the large house and the third section of the barn constructed. She moved into Charles City around 1865, and sold the farm to A.W. Cook who remained here until his death in 1887. He is believed to be the first person in Iowa to raise Percheron's, which he imported from France. He also raised Shorthorn cattle.
