= Southern Syncopated Orchestra =

Early jazz musical group

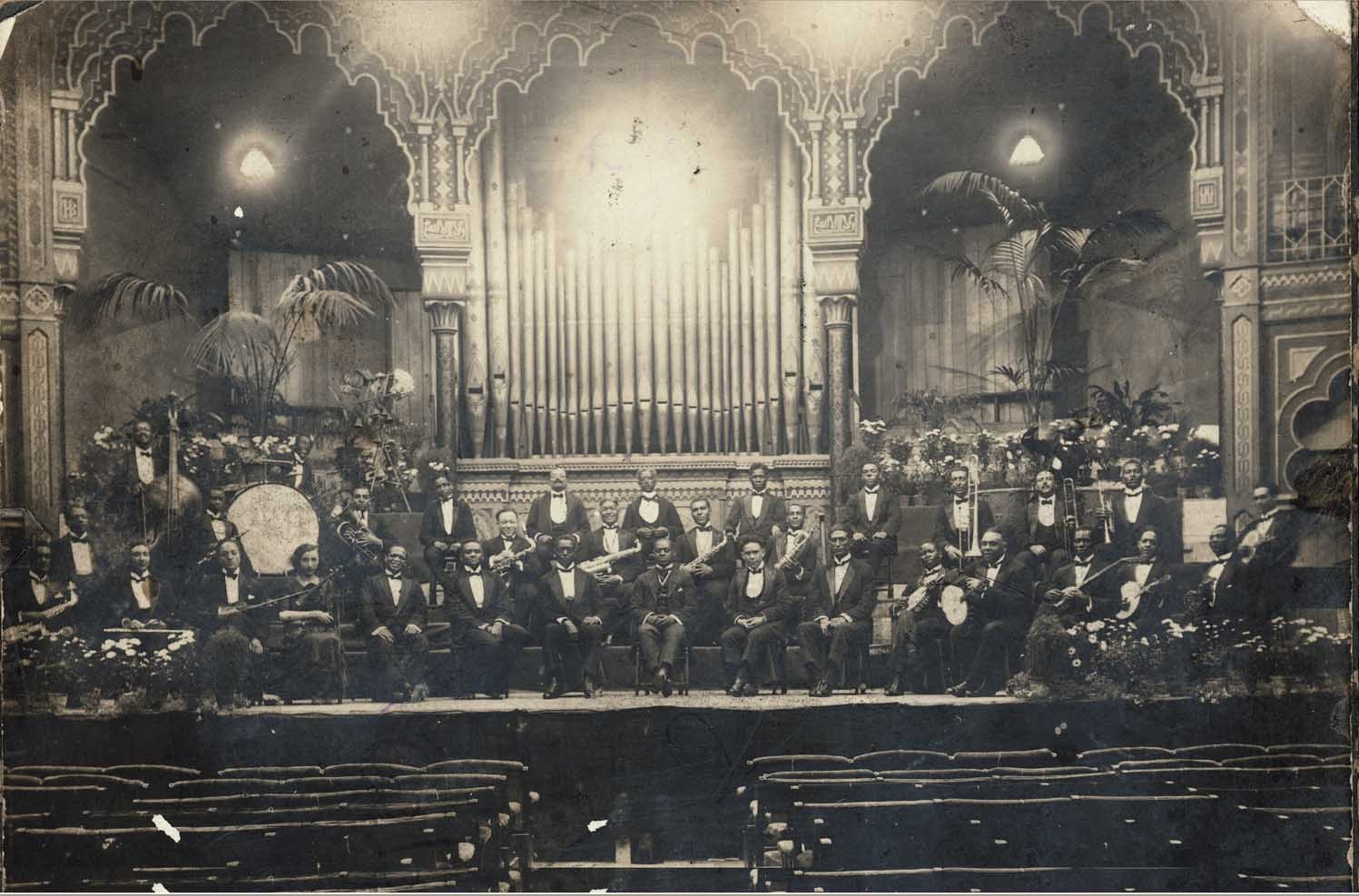
- Southern Syncopated Orchestra at a London venue around 1920

Background information
- Genres: Jazz
- Years active: 1919–1921
- Past members: Sidney Bechet; Evelyn Dove; Will Marion Cook

Southern Syncopated Orchestra (SSO), established first in the U.S. as the New York Syncopated Orchestra, was an early jazz group known for bringing Black musicians to the UK. The group was founded by Will Marion Cook. Members of the group included New Orleans clarinetist Sidney Bechet, British vocalist Evelyn Dove (using the name Norma Winchester), and soprano Hattie King Reavis. The SSO toured the UK and Ireland between 1919 and 1921.

The orchestra made successful annual tours around Britain and the Continent performing classical music, rag tunes, blues, slave songs and jazz. Highly popular, they attracted 328,000 paid admissions to hear them at the Kelvin Hall, Glasgow, in 1920. During their 1921 Farewell Tour of Europe they completed three weeks at the Lyric Theatre, Glasgow, in October 1921, which would be their last performance.

The public was shocked to hear of the sinking of the ship SS Rowan taking them on to their next venue, Dublin. Of the 120 people on board, 36 died, including nine players, when in dense fog late at night off Corsewall Point, Wigtownshire, the Rowan was struck by the American freighter West Camak and then cut in two by the Clan Malcolm, outward-bound from Glasgow for South Africa, which had come to the rescue at full speed. The survivors came back to Glasgow, where theatres staged Relief Fund concerts in aid of the surviving members and to help replace their musical instruments, all of which had been lost. On 17 October 1921, the orchestra opened at La Scala Theatre, Dublin, for the delayed two-week engagement, before going on to play venues in Derry and Belfast. The orchestra disbanded in November 1921.

== Legacy ==
In 2013, two of the SSO musicians who died in the sinking of the SS Rowan were commemorated with blue plaques erected by the Nubian Jak Community Trust on properties where they had resided in London: vocalist Frank Bates and drummer Pete Robinson.

== See also ==
- Harry Malcolm Wellmon – former conductor
