= Gotham-Attucks Music Publishing Company =

Bygone American company

The Gotham-Attucks Music Publishing Company ("The House of Melody") was an African-American owned firm based in Manhattan, New York, that was formed July 15, 1905, by merger of the Gotham Music Company and the Attucks Music Publishing Company. The Gotham Music Company was founded by composer Will Marion Cook and songwriter Richard Cecil McPherson (aka Cecil Mack) and the Attucks Music Publishing Company, the first African-American music publishing company in the United States, founded in 1904 by Sheperd Nathaniel Edmonds (1874–1941). Gotham-Attucks ceased to operate as a legitimate music publisher after its sale to the "song shark" Ferdinand E. Miersch in 1911.

== History ==
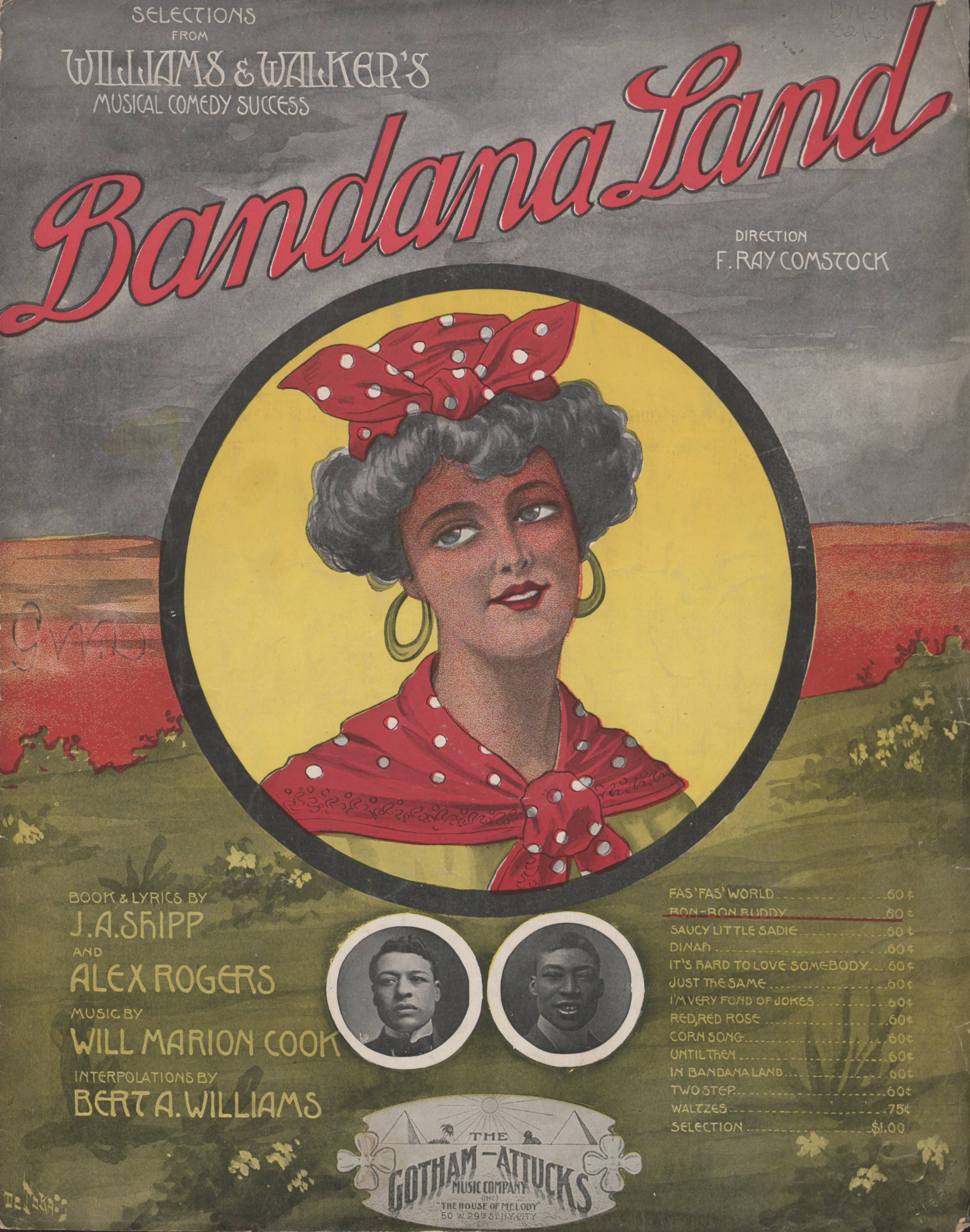
Sheet music cover: Bandanna Land (1908); Andréa Stephen Chevalier De Takacs (1880–1919)(illustrator); cameo photos: Bert Williams (White Studio) and George Walker

"Attucks" was the surname of Crispus Attucks (1723–1770), an African American widely regarded as the first person killed in the Boston Massacre, which, by extension, makes him the first American killed in the American Revolution.

The Gotham-Attucks firm, according to Wayne D. Shirley in 1987, then a Music Specialist in the Music Division of the Library of Congress, (Note: Wayne Douglas Shirley (born 1936), from 1965 to 2002, worked at the Library of Congress, first as a reference librarian, then music specialist in the Music Division, retiring as Senior Music Specialist. (OCLC 4779683717)) was a small music publisher with relatively low output, but notable for the music it published. Despite never publishing more than twenty pieces a year over its eight-year existence, Gotham-Attucks managed to produce a remarkable number of important pieces. Its roster of composers and lyricists, according to Shirley, was impressive: Will Marion Cook, Bert Williams, Cecil Mack, Alex Rogers (né Alexander Claude Rogers; 1876–1930), William Tyers (1870–1924), Chris Smith, James Reese Europe, Wm. H. Dixon (1879-1917) "Malinda, Come Down To Me," Tom Lemonier (1870–1945), James Tim Brymn, Henry Creamer, and Ford Dabney – all of whom influential in the history of popular music in the early years of the 20th century. Shirley asserted that, aside from an impressive roster of people, many of the works published by Gotham-Attucks during its short tenure are still important, especially "Nobody," Bert Williams's signature song, and "Shine," a song with an enduring legacy that, among other things, has been included by musicologist Richard Crawford in The Core Repertory of Jazz Standards on Record, 1900–1942.

== Personnel ==
Gotham-Attucks Music Company

1907
42 West 28th Street, Manhattan, New York
Executives

- Alexander Rogers, President
- Richard C. McPherson, Secretary

(Capital $10,000)
Directors

- Alexander Rogers
- Richard C. McPherson
- Barron D. Wilkins (1862–1924)
- George W. Walker
- Bert W. Williams
- Jesse A. Shipp
- Wm. H. Dixon (1879-1917)

=== Attucks Music Publishing Company ===
- "Why Adam Sinned" (1904), Alex Rogers (words and music)
- "Me an' de Minstrel Ban'" (1904), James Vaughan (né James Joseph Jefferson Vaughan; 1874–1945) (music), Alex Rogers (words)
- "I May Be Crazy but I Ain't No Fool" (1904), Alex Rogers (words and music)
- "When the Moon Shines" (1904), James Vaughan (music), Alex Rogers (words)
- "Never!" (1904), Alex Rogers (words and music)
- "Fare Thee! On Ma' Way! Jes' Gone!" (1904), Jesse A. Shipp (words and music)
- "The Squee-Gee," a characteristic two-step march (1904), for piano, William Tyers (1870–1924) (music)
- "My Love for You Is Dyin'" (1904), Jesse A. Shipp (music), Alex Rogers (words)
- "Just as Fleet as a Bird or Susan" (1904), Shepard N. Edmonds (words and music)
- "Della from Delaware" (1904), Tom Lemonier (music), Will Tobias (words)
- "Décollett: Intermezzo" for piano (1904), Warner Crosby (né Warner Pratt Crosby; 1870–1907; suicide) (music)
- "A Female Fancy" (1905), Shepard N. Edmonds (words and music) (registered as an Attucks publication, but published by Shepard N. Edmonds Music Pub. Co.)
- "They Were Happy in Their Little Mountain Home" (1904)
- "Nellie Darling" (1904), William H. Nelson (music), M.J. Fitzpatrick (né Michael J. Fitzpatrick; 1963–1950) (words)
- "Down at the Hippodrome" (1905), John C. Rundback (né John Caspar Rundback; 1880–1959) (music), James T. Quirk (né James Timothy Quirk; born 1883) (words)
- "Some O' Dese Days" (1905), Frank Williams (words and music)
- "Wooing 'neath the Silvery Moon" (1905)
- "Mandy, You and Me!" (1905), Chris Smith and James Henry Burris (words and music)
- "Nobody" (1905), Bert A. Williams (music), Alex Rogers (words)
- "Miss Georgia" (1905), Bert A. Williams (music), Alex Rogers (words)

=== Gotham Music Publishing Company ===
- There's a Place in the Old Vacant Chair" (1905), Will Marion Cook (words and music)
- "I'm on to You" (1905), Ben Bross (words and music)
- "Obadiah" (You Took Advantage of Me") (1905), James Reese Europe (words and music)
- "Let's Play a Game of Soldiers" (1905), Tom Lemonier (music), James T. Quirk (words)
- "Lulu" ("Tell Me Lulu, Do") (1905), Will Marion Cook (music) Richard Cecil McPherson (words)
- "Frenzied Finance" (1905), Al C. Murphy (music), Earle C. Jones (words)
- "Strolling in Summer" (1905), Al C. Murphy (music), Earle C. Jones (words)

=== Gotham-Attucks Music Company ===
- "Malinda" ("Come Down to Me") (1905), Will Dixon (words and music)
- "Good Bye Baby Mine" (1905), James Tim Brymn (words and music)
- "Little Moses" (1905), Bert A. Williams (music), Earle C. Jones (words), featurred in Lew Dockstader's Great Minstrel Production
- "Lorraine" (1905), Bert A. Williams (music), Earle C. Jones (words), featurred in Lew Dockstader's Great Minstrel Production
- "Pretty Desdamone" (1905), F. Collis Wildman (né Frederick Collis Wildman; 1883–1956) (words and music), as presented by Williams & Walker at Hammerstein's Victoria Theater

Form Abyssinia (1906)

- "Here It Comes Again" (1906), Bert A. Williams (music), Alex Rogers and Earle C. Jones (words)
- "The Jolly Jungle Boys" (1906), Bert A. Williams (music), Earle C. Jones (words)
- "It's Hard to Find a King Like Me" (1906), James Vaughan (music), Alex Rogers (words)
- "Rastus Johnson, U.S.A." (1906), Bert A. Williams (music), Alex Rogers (words)
- "Where My Forefathers Died" (1906), Bert A. Williams (music), Alex Rogers (words)
- "The Tale of the Monkey Maid" ("or, Die Trying") (1906), Bert A. Williams (music), Alex Rogers (words), sang by Aida Overton Walker
- "The Island of By and By" (1908), Bert A. Williams (music), Alex Rogers (words), as sang by Aida Overton Walker

Gotham-Attucks (continued)

- "He's a Cousin of Mine" (1906) (from Marrying Mary), Chris Smith and Silvio Hein (1879–1928) (music), Cecil Mack (words)
- "Let It Alone" (1906), Bert A. Williams (music), Alex Rogers (words)
- "Build a Nest for Birdie" (1906), James Tim Brymn (music), Richard Cecil McPherson (words)
- "All In Down and Out" ("Sorry Aint Got It, You Could Get It, If I Had It") (1906), Chris Smith and Billy B. Johnson (music), R. C. McPherson (words)
- "It's Great to Be in Love" (from The Ides of March) (1907), Anatole Friedland (music), Allen T. Hopping (words), as produced by the Columbia Varsity Show
- "That's Where Friendship Ends" (1907), Chris Smith (music), R. C. McPherson (words)
- "Just An Old Friend of the Family" (1907), Chris Smith (music), R. C. McPherson (words)

From Bandanna Land

- "Just The Same" (1907)
- "Bon Bon Buddy" (1907), Will Marion Cook (music), Alex Rogers (words)
- "Fas', Fas' World" (1907), Bert A. Williams (music), Alex Rogers (words)
- "Late hours " (1907), Bert A. Williams (words), David Kempner (words)
- "In Bandanna Lan'" (1908), Will Marion Cook (music), Mord Allen (Note: Mord Allen (né Junius Mordecai Allen; 1875–1953) was an African American poet.) (words)
- "Until Then" (1908), Will Marion Cook (music), Alex Rogers (words)
- "Red Red Rose" (1908), Will Marion Cook (music), Alex Rogers (words), published in low, medium, and high keys, and in a version with violin or cello obligato
- The Sheath Gown in Darktown" (1908), J. Lubrie Hill (music), Mord Allen (words)
- "In My Old Home" ("In Dixie Land") (1908), Tom Lemonier (music), Mord Allen (words)
- "It's Hard to Love Somebody" ("Who's Loving Somebody Else") (1907), Chris Smith (music), R. C. McPherson (words)
- "I'd Rather Have Nothin' All of the Time, Than Somethin' for a Little While" (1908), Bert A. Williams (music), John B. Lowitz (words)
- "Any Old Place in Yankee Land Is Good Enough for Me" (1908), Will Marion Cook and Chris Smith (music), Alex Rogers (words)

Gotham-Attucks (continued)

- "Be My Little Dinah True" (1908)
- "For the Last Time Call Me Sweetheart (1908), Louise A. Johns (music), Cecil Mack (words), published in low, medium, and high keys
- "Welcome to Our City," characteristic rag two-step with song trio (1908), for piano with interlinear words to trio, Herman Carle and Cecil Mack(words and music)
- "Maori: a Samoan Dance" (1908), for piano. William Tyers (1870–1924) (music)
- "Sue Simmons ("Bill's Sister") (1908), J. Leubrie Hill (words and music), cover art: E. H. Pfeiffer (né Edward Henry Pfeiffer; 1868–1932)
- "Kinky" (1908), Will Marion Cook (music), Mord Allen & Ed Green (words)
- "Down Among the Sugar Cane (1909), Cecil Mack and Chris Smith (music), Avery & Hart (words)
- "Abraham Lincoln Jones or 101" ("The Christening") (1909), Cecil Mack and Chris Smith (words and music)
- "In Pumpkin Pickin'" (1909), Chris Smith (music), Cecil Mack (words)
- "Dear Old Moonlight" (1909), Tom Lemonier (music), Henry Creamer (words)
- "Any Old Town is a Lonesome Old Town" ("When Your Sweetheart Is Away") (1910) Maurice Daniels (music), Bert Spears (words)
- "I'm Going Mad Over You" (1910), William H. Farrell (music), Charles G. Kane (words)
- "If He Comes In I'm Going Out" (1910) Chris Smith (music), Cecil Mack (words)
- "My Little Jungle Maid" (1910), William H. Farrell (music), Henry Creamer and Charles A. Parker (words)
- "Way Down East" (1910), Joe Young and Harold Norman (music), Cecil Mack (words)
- "Sweetness" (1910), Tom Lemonier (music), Henry Creamer (words)
- "That Minor Strain" (1910) (from Ziegfeld Follies of 1910), Ford Dabney (1910), Cecil Mack

From His Honor the Barber

- "That's Why They Call Me Shine" (1910), Ford Dabney, Cecil Mack (words)
- "Porto Rico" (1910), James Tim Brymn (music), R. C. McPherson (words)

Gotham-Attucks (continued)

- "When You See the Snowflakes Falling" (1911), Bert Grant (music), Joe Young (words)
- "What Makes Me Love You the Way I Do?" (1911), Barney Barber (music), Cecil Mack (words)
- "The Riddle Song" (1911) ("That Little Thing Called Love"), Chris Smith, Cecil Mack (words)
