= Shine (1910 song) =

1910 song by Cecil Mack, Lew Brown and Ford Dabney

1924 sheet music

Shine is a popular song with lyrics by Cecil Mack and Tin Pan Alley songwriter Lew Brown and music by Ford Dabney. The song was first published as That's Why They Call Me Shine in 1910, with Mack and Dabney credited as the only writers. At the time of the initial publication, Mack was already established in the world of African-American popular songwriting, having worked on hits with Chris Smith, while Dabney had not written a hit song. The 1910 version of the song was published by African-American owned firm Gotham-Attucks Music Publishing Company, and used by Aida Overton Walker in His Honor the Barber, an African-American road show. According to Perry Bradford, himself a songster and publisher, the original version of the song was written about an actual man named Shine who was with George Walker when they were badly beaten during the New York City race riot of 1900.

In 1924, the revised version ("Shine") crediting both Mack and Lew Brown for the lyrics was published by Shapiro, Bernstein & Co., a Tin Pan Alley firm that was publishing songs by Lew Brown at the time. The 1924 version has an entirely new lyric for the chorus and verses, and completely new music for the verses. In the chorus, the new lyric shifts the narrative from that of an African-American person who likes to "take troubles smiling, never whine" to a less-specific narrative about smiling and keeping shoes and rooms tidy as a way to achieve happiness. Likewise, the 1924 verse lyric replaces the theme of ignoring derogatory name-calling with a story about a poor shoeshiner who "had a grin guaranteed to bring the business in." Some sheet music editions with the 1924 copyright feature both chorus lyrics, while others feature only the newer lyric co-credited to Lew Brown. The 1910 verse lyrics did not get reprinted after the version of the lyrics with Lew Brown as co-writer were introduced. Also changed for the 1924 edition of the song was the length of the chorus, which in the 1910 version had been 30 bars with an ABAC structure. In the 1910 version, the "B" section was an unusual 6 bars in length. (In both versions, A_{1} and A_{2} differ slightly.) For the 1924 version, the structure of the chorus was changed to the more standard thirty-two-bar form, still with the ABAC structure.

The song was recorded by jazz and jazz-influenced artists such as The California Ramblers (their version was very popular in 1924), Louis Armstrong (recorded March 9, 1931 for Okeh Records, catalog No. 41486), Ella Fitzgerald (recorded November 19, 1936 for Decca Records – catalog. No. 1062), Benny Goodman, Harry James, and Frankie Laine (1947 and 1957 – the 1947 version reached No. 9 in the Billboard charts), usually without the sectional verse that introduces the song's narrator.

Bing Crosby & The Mills Brothers recorded the song on February 29, 1932 with studio orchestra conducted by Victor Young. It was issued on Brunswick Records 11376-A, a 78 rpm record and it is assessed by Joel Whitburn as reaching the No. 7 position in the charts of the day.

As a member of the Hoboken Four, Frank Sinatra sang this song in 1935 on the Major Bowes Amateur Hour.

Albert Nicholas, clarinet, with The Big Chief Jazz Band recorded it in Oslo on August 29, 1955. It was released on the 78 rpm record Philips P 53037 H.

Joe Brown and The Bruvvers recorded the song in 1961 and reached the British charts with a peak position of No. 33.

Anne Murray included this song on her 1976 Capitol Records album, Keeping in Touch.

Ry Cooder recorded the song complete with introduction in 1978 (see below).

Spanish vocal quartet Los Rosillo, recorded a Spanish version, with the original spoken intro, in their debut album in 1988.

== Louis Armstrong version ==
The song was performed in a film short A Rhapsody in Black and Blue by Armstrong. The 1931 recording by Armstrong with his Sebastian New Cotton Club Orchestra is a subset of the complete lyric of the 1910 version and the expanded later version, with added scat singing and long instrumental ending:

[Instrumental opening ~35 sec.]

Oh chocolate drop, that’s me
’Cause, my hair is curly
Just because my teeth are pearly
Just because I always wear a smile
Like to dress up in the latest style
’Cause I’m glad I’m livin’
Take troubles all with a smile
Just because my color's shady
Makes no difference, baby
That’s why they call me "Shine"

[repeat words with scat and straight jazz instrumental ~2 min.]

SHINE (That's Why They Call Me Shine) (Cecil Mack, Lew Brown)

== Ry Cooder version with original introduction ==
On his 1978 album Jazz, Ry Cooder performed the song with a small jazz band for accompaniment, singing the original 1910 chorus lyric and the first of the two 1910 verse lyrics. Cooder wrote liner notes for the album and said of the song that it had been written near the end of the "Coon song era", calling it "a unique comment on that genre's black face sensibilities."

== Film appearances ==
- 1931 A Rhapsody in Black and Blue – performed by Louis Armstrong and band
- 1941 Birth of the Blues – sung by Bing Crosby
- 1942 Casablanca – the song is sung by Sam (Dooley Wilson) and the band at Rick's Café in the movie.
- 1943 Cabin in the Sky – John William Sublett (aka John W. Bubbles) animates "Shine" brilliantly in a song-and-dance number in the movie.
- 1955 The Benny Goodman Story – performed on trumpet by Harry James.
- 1956 The Eddy Duchin Story – performed by Tyrone Power as Eddy Duchin and Rex Thompson as Peter Duchin with accompaniment.
