= James P. Johnson =

American pianist and composer (1894–1955)

- Johnson in 1946; by William P. Gottlieb

Background information
- Born: James Price Johnson; February 1, 1894; New Brunswick, New Jersey, U.S.
- Died: November 17, 1955 (aged 61) New York City, U.S.
- Genre: Jazz
- Occupations: Musician; composer
- Instrument: Piano
- Years active: 1912–1955

James Price Johnson (February 1, 1894 – November 17, 1955) was an American pianist and composer. A pioneer of stride piano, he was one of the most important pianists in the early era of recording, and like Jelly Roll Morton, one of the key figures in the evolution of ragtime into what was eventually called jazz. Johnson was a major influence on Count Basie, Duke Ellington, Art Tatum, Thelonious Monk, and Fats Waller, who was his student. According to Hound Dog, the 2009 biography of the songwriting partnership between Jerry Leiber and Mike Stoller, Johnson also gave lessons to Stoller.

Johnson composed many hit songs, including the unofficial anthem of the Roaring Twenties, "The Charleston", and he remained the acknowledged king of New York jazz pianists through most of the 1930s. Johnson's artistry, influence on early popular music, and contributions to musical theatre are often overlooked, and as such, he has been referred to by musicologist David Schiff as "The Invisible Pianist".

== Biography ==
=== Early life and education ===
Johnson was born in New Brunswick, New Jersey, on February 1, 1894. The proximity to New York City meant that the full cosmopolitan spectrum of the city's musical experience, from bars, to cabarets, to the symphony, were at the young Johnson's disposal. Johnson's father, William H. Johnson, was a store helper and mechanic, while his mother, Josephine Harrison, was a maid. Harrison was a member of the choir at the Methodist Church and was also a self-taught pianist. Johnson later cited the popular African-American songs and dances he heard at home and around the city as early influences on his musical taste. In 1908, Johnson's family moved to the San Juan Hill neighborhood of New York City (near where Lincoln Center stands today) and subsequently moved again to uptown in 1911.

With perfect pitch and excellent recall, Johnson was soon able to pick out the piano tunes that he had heard. He grew up listening to the ragtime of Scott Joplin and always retained links to the ragtime era, playing and recording Joplin's "Maple Leaf Rag", as well as the more modern (according to Johnson) and demanding "Euphonic Sounds", both several times in the 1940s. Johnson, who gained his first job as a pianist in 1912, decided to pursue his musical career rather than return to school. From 1913 to 1916, Johnson spent time studying the European piano tradition with Bruto Giannini. Over the next four to five years, Johnson continued to develop his ragtime piano skills by studying other pianists and composing his own rags.

=== Early career: 1914—1929 ===
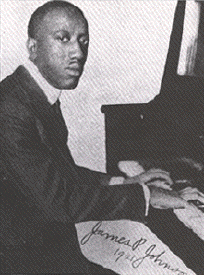
Johnson in 1921

In 1914, while performing in Newark, New Jersey with singer Lillie Mae Wright, who became his wife three years later, Johnson met Willie "The Lion" Smith. Smith and Johnson shared many of the same ideas regarding entertainers and their stage appearance. These beliefs and their complementary personalities led the two to become best friends. Starting in 1918, Johnson and Wright began touring together in the Smart Set Revue before settling back in New York in 1919.

Before 1920, Johnson had gained a reputation as a pianist on the East coast on a par with Eubie Blake and Luckey Roberts and made dozens of player piano roll recordings initially documenting his own ragtime compositions before recording for Aeolian, Perfection (the label of the Standard Music Roll Co., Orange, New Jersey), Artempo (label of Bennett & White, Inc., Newark, New Jersey), Rythmodik, and QRS during the period from 1917 to 1927. During this period he met George Gershwin, who was also a young piano-roll artist at Aeolian.

As his piano style continued to evolve, his 1921 phonograph recordings of his own compositions, "Harlem Strut", "Keep Off the Grass", "Carolina Shout", and "Worried and Lonesome Blues" were, along with Jelly Roll Morton's Gennett recordings of 1923, among the first jazz piano solos to be put on record. These technically challenging compositions would be learned by his contemporaries, and would serve as test pieces in solo competitions, in which the New York pianists would demonstrate their mastery of the keyboard, as well as the swing, harmonies, and improvisational skills which would further distinguish the great masters of the era.

The majority of his phonograph recordings of the 1920s and early 1930s were done for Black Swan (founded by Johnson's friend W. C. Handy, where William Grant Still served in an A&R capacity) and Columbia. In 1922, Johnson branched out and became the musical director for the revue Plantation Days. This revue took him to England for four months in 1923. During the summer of 1923, Johnson, along with the help of lyricist Cecil Mack, wrote the revue Runnin' Wild. This revue stayed on tour for more than five years as well as showing on Broadway.

=== Swing era: 1930–1939 ===
In the Depression era, Johnson's career slowed down somewhat. As the swing era began to gain popularity within the African-American communities, Johnson had a hard time adapting, and his music would ultimately become unpopular. The cushion of a modest but steady income from his royalties as a composer allowed him to devote significant time to the furtherance of his education, as well as the realization of his desire to compose "serious" orchestral music. Johnson began to write for musical revues, and composed many now-forgotten orchestral music pieces. Although by this time, he was an established composer, with a significant body of work, as well as a member of ASCAP, he was nonetheless unable to secure the financial support that he sought from either the Rosenwald Foundation or a Guggenheim Fellowship; he had received endorsement for each from Columbia Records executive and long-time admirer John Hammond. The Johnson archives include the letterhead of an organization called Friends of James P. Johnson, ostensibly founded at the time (presumably in the late 1930s) in order to promote his then-idling career. Names on the letter-head included Paul Robeson, Fats Waller, Walter White (President of the NAACP), the actress Mercedes Gilbert and Bessye Bearden, the mother of artist Romare Bearden. In the late 1930s, Johnson slowly started to re-emerge with the revival of interest in traditional jazz and began to record, with his own and other groups, at first for the H.R.S. label. Johnson's appearances at the Spirituals to Swing concerts at Carnegie Hall in 1938 and 1939 were organized by John Hammond, for whom he recorded a substantial series of solo and band sides in 1939.

=== Later career: 1940–1951 ===
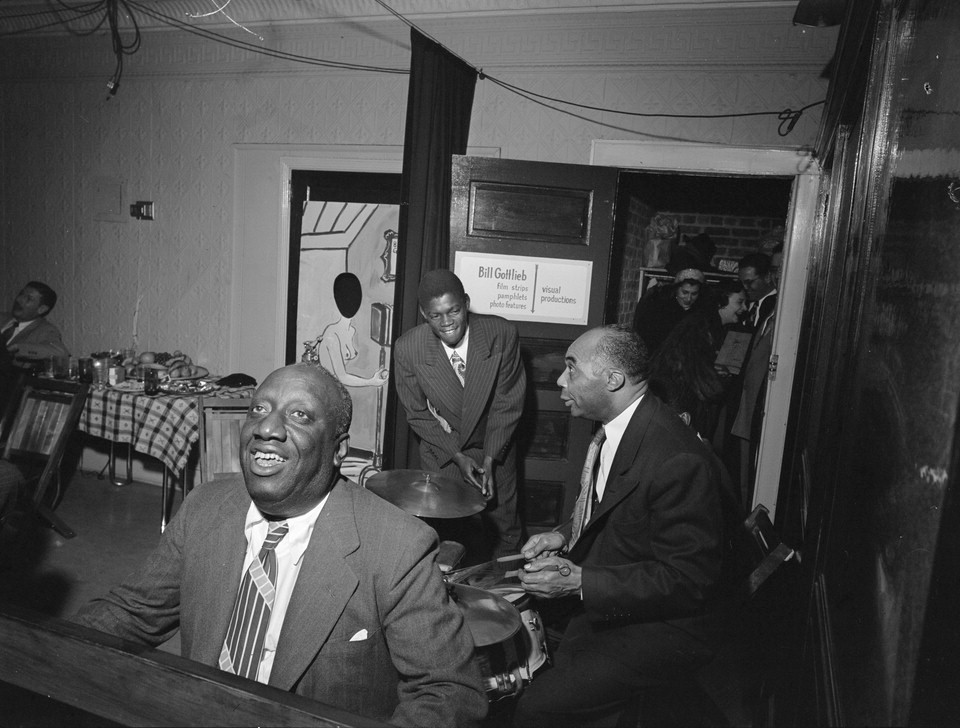
James P. Johnson, Fess Williams, Freddie Moore, Joe Thomas 1948. Photography by William P. Gottlieb.

Johnson suffered a stroke (likely a transient ischemic attack or mini-stroke) in August 1940. When Johnson returned to action, in 1942, he began a heavy schedule of performing, composing, and recording, leading several small live and groups, now often with racially integrated bands led by musicians such as Eddie Condon, Yank Lawson, Sidney de Paris, Sidney Bechet, Rod Cless, and Edmond Hall. In 1944, Johnson and Willie "The Lion" Smith participated in stride piano contests in Greenwich Village from August to December. He recorded for jazz labels including Asch, Black & White, Blue Note, Commodore, Circle, and Decca. In 1945, Johnson performed with Louis Armstrong and heard his works at Carnegie Hall and Town Hall in New York City. He was a regular guest star and featured soloist on Rudi Blesh's This is Jazz broadcasts, as well as at Eddie Condon's Town Hall concerts. As such, he was regarded as something as a distinguished pioneer of the idiom, and was often referred to as "The Dean of Jazz Pianists". Never satisfied with the state of his craft, he continued his musical education, begun in the 1930s, studying with Maury Deutsch, who could also count Django Reinhardt and Charlie Parker among his pupils.

In the late 1940s, Johnson had a variety of jobs, including jam sessions at Stuyvesant Casino and Central Plaza, as well as becoming a regular on Rudi Blesh's radio show. In 1949 as an 18-year-old, actor and band leader Conrad Janis put together a band of musicians, consisting of James P. Johnson (piano), Henry Goodwin (trumpet), Edmond Hall (clarinet), Pops Foster (bass) and Baby Dodds (drums), with Janis on trombone. Johnson permanently retired from performing after suffering a severe, paralyzing stroke in 1951. Johnson survived financially on his songwriting royalties while he was paralyzed. He died four years later in Jamaica, Queens, New York City and is buried in Mount Olivet Cemetery in Maspeth, Queens. Perfunctory obituaries appeared in even The New York Times. The pithiest and most angry remembrance of Johnson was written by John Hammond and appeared in DownBeat under the title "Talents of James P. Johnson Went Unappreciated".

== Compositions ==
"Twelfth Avenue"
Johnson's 1943 "Twelfth Avenue"

Johnson composed many hit tunes in his work for musical theatre, including "Charleston". It debuted in his Broadway show Runnin' Wild in 1923, although by some accounts Johnson had written it years earlier. It became one of the most popular songs of the Roaring Twenties. He also wrote "If I Could Be with You (One Hour Tonight)", "You've Got to Be Modernistic", "Don't Cry Baby", "Keep off the Grass", "Old Fashioned Love", "A Porter's Love Song to a Chambermaid", "Carolina Shout", and "Snowy Morning Blues". He wrote waltzes, ballet, symphonic pieces and light opera; many of these extended works exist in manuscript form in various stages of completeness in the collection of Johnson's papers housed at the Institute of Jazz Studies, Rutgers University, Newark, New Jersey. Johnson's success as a popular composer qualified him as a member of ASCAP in 1926.

Premiered in 1928, Johnson's Yamekraw, a Negro Rhapsody, was named after a black community in Savannah, Georgia. William Grant Still was orchestrator and Fats Waller the pianist as Johnson was contractually obliged to conduct his and Waller's hit Broadway show Keep Shufflin. Harlem Symphony, composed during the 1930s, was performed at Carnegie Hall in 1945 with Johnson at the piano and Joseph Cherniavsky as conductor. He collaborated with Langston Hughes on the one-act opera, De Organizer. A fuller list of Johnson's film scores appears below.

=== Pianist ===
Along with Fats Waller, Willie "The Lion" Smith, and Luckey Roberts, Johnson embodies the Harlem Stride piano style, an evolution of East Coast ragtime infused with elements of the blues. His "Carolina Shout" was a standard test piece and rite of passage for every contemporary pianist: Duke Ellington learned it note for note from the 1921 QRS Johnson piano roll. Johnson taught Waller and got him his first piano roll and recording assignments.

Harlem Stride is distinguished from ragtime by several essential characteristics: ragtime introduced sustained syncopation into piano music, but stride pianists built a more freely swinging rhythm into their performances, with a certain degree of anticipation of the left (bass) hand by the right (melody) hand, a form of tension and release in the patterns played by the right hand, interpolated within the beat generated by the left. Stride more frequently incorporates elements of the blues, as well as harmonies more complex than usually found in the works of classic ragtime composers. Lastly, while ragtime was for the most part a composed music, based on European light classics such as marches, pianists such as Waller and Johnson introduced their own rhythmic, harmonic and melodic figures into their performances and, occasionally, spontaneous improvisation. As the second generation stride pianist Dick Wellstood observed, in liner notes for recordings by the stride pianist Donald Lambert, most of the stride pianists of the 1920s, 1930s and 1940s were not particularly good improvisers. Rather, they would play their own, very well worked out, and often rehearsed variations on popular songs of the day, with very little change from one performance to another. It was in this respect that Johnson distinguished himself from his colleagues, in that (in his own words), he "could think of a trick a minute". Comparison of many of Johnson's recordings of a given tune over the years demonstrates variation from one performance to another, characterized by respect for the melody, and reliance upon a worked out set of melodic, rhythmic, and harmonic devices, such as repeated chords, serial thirds (hence his admiration for Bach), and interpolated scales, on which the improvisations were based. This same set of variations might then appear in the performance of another tune.

== Legacy ==
Johnson may be thought of as both the last major pianist of the classic ragtime era and the first major jazz pianist. As such, he is considered an indispensable bridge between ragtime and jazz. Johnson's musical legacy is also present in the body of work of his pupil, Thomas "Fats" Waller, as well as scores of other pianists who were influenced by him, including Art Tatum, Donald Lambert, Louis Mazetier, Pat Flowers, Cliff Jackson, Hank Duncan, Claude Hopkins, Duke Ellington, Count Basie, Don Ewell, Johnny Guarnieri, Dick Hyman, Dick Wellstood, Ralph Sutton, Joe Turner, Neville Dickie, Mike Lipskin, and Butch Thompson.

Johnson was a pioneer, and one of the main originators of what is known today as the (Harlem) stride style of jazz piano playing. "Stride piano has often been described as an orchestral style and indeed, in contrast to boogie-woogie blues piano playing, it requires a fabulous conceptual independence, the left hand differentiating bass and mid-range lines while the right supplies melodic issues". Johnson honed his craft, playing night after night, catering to the egos and idiosyncrasies of the many singers he encountered, which necessitated being able to play a song in any key. He developed into a sensitive and facile accompanist, the favorite accompanist of Ethel Waters and Bessie Smith. Waters wrote in her autobiography that working with musicians such as, and most especially, Johnson "made you want to sing until your tonsils fell out".

== Album discography ==
- 1921 The Piano Roll (Folkways, 1964)
- 1921–26 James P. Johnson 1921–1926 (Olympic Records, 1974)
- 1921-27 Backwater Blues: The Stride Piano Of James P. Johnson (Riverside Records, 1961)
- 1921-39 Father Of The Stride Piano (Columbia, 1962) anthology of Colomubia recordings. Reissued in CD with the same title
- 1944 New York Jazz (Asch, 1944) (3x78'rpm), six tracks of piano solo
- 1944.09 Happy harlem: James P. Johnson Quartet with others... (Jazz Guild, 1957). Only three titles with J. P. Johnson under Rod Cless Quartet
- 1945.05 The Original James P. Johnson (Folkways, 1973)
- 1946.09 Jazz of the Forties, Vol. 1: Jazz at Town Hall (Folkways, 1960). Seven titles with J P Johnson
- 1947 Harlem Party Piano (Riverside Records, 1956). James P. Johnson on side A, Luckey Roberts on side B
- 1944-49 Ain'tcha Got Music (Pumpkin Productions, 1981)
- 1921-45 Giants of Jazz: James P. Johnson (3xLp) (Time-Life Records, 1981), an extendet Johnson anthology covering his whole career

Johnson's largest recording anthology was compiled in 1981 by Time-Life Music (Giants of Jazz series) in a three-LPs set. The collection,40 sides recorded from 1921 to 1945, is enriched by extensive liner notes, a biographical essay by Frank Kappler and criticism by Dick Wellstood and the musicologist Willa Rouder.

== CD re-issues ==
- 1921–28: The Chronological (Classics #658, 1992)
- 1928–38: The Chronological (Classics #671, 1992)
- 1938–42: The Chronological (Classics #711, 1995)
- 1943–44: The Chronological (Classics, 1995)
- 1944.01: The Chronological (Classics, 1995)
- 1944.01: The Chronological (Classics, 1995)
- 1944–45: The Chronological (Classics, 1998)
- 1945–47: The Chronological (Classics, 1999)
- 1942–45: The Original James P. Johnson: 1942–1945, Piano Solos (Smithsonian Folkways, 1996)
- 1921–44: Classic James P. Johnson Sessions, 1921–1944 (Mosaic, 2016)[6×CD]
- 1943–44: The Blue Note Jazzmen (Blue Note, 1998)[2×CD]

Father of the Stride Piano (CBS/Sony) is the CD re-issue of a Columbia LP that collects some of Johnson's best recordings for the label between 1921 and 1939. It includes several solos from the 1920s:"Carolina Shout", "Worried and Lonesome Blues", and "Hungry Blues" (from De Organizer) and band and solos sides recorded in 1939.

The Biograph label has re-issued on CD approximately 60 of Johnson's piano rolls, recorded between 1917 and 1927. A book of musical transcriptions of Johnson's piano roll performances of his own compositions has been prepared by Robert Pinsker, to be published through the auspices of the James P. Johnson Foundation.

The most complete CD collection of his work, including alternate takes, has been produced by Michael Cuscuna and his associates at Mosaic Records with the box Classic James P. Johnson Sessions, 1921-1944, that includes all of Johnson's piano solos, band sides, and blues accompaniments, done during this period, for the major commercial labels, exclusive of Decca/Brunswick, and RCA Victor.

Even more complete, but without the alternate takes, is the french The Chronological serie by Classics . The eight discs devoted to Johnson cover the period 1921-1947.

James P. is also featured prominently in the Mosaic re-issues of the Commodore (under Max Kaminsky's name) and the HRS labels (Pee Wee Russells's Rhythm Makers).

The Decca CD, Snowy Morning Blues, contains 20 sides recorded for the Brunswick and Decca labels, between 1930 and 1944 with an eight-tune Fats Waller Memorial set, and two solos, "Jingles", and "You've Got to be Modernistic", which demonstrate Johnson's hard swinging stride style.

Johnson's complete Blue Note recordings (solos, band sides in groups led by himself as well as by Edmond Hall and Sidney DeParis) were issued in a collection by Mosaic Records and, later, in a 2CD selection in 1998 entitled The Blue Note Jazzmen.

== Honors and recognitions ==
On September 16, 1995, the U.S. Post Office issued a James P. Johnson 32-cent commemorative postage stamp.

Year inducted	Title
1970	Songwriters Hall of Fame
1973	DownBeat Jazz Hall of Fame
1980	Big Band and Jazz Hall of Fame
2007	ASCAP Jazz Wall of Fame

Johnson is buried at Mount Olivet Cemetery in Maspeth, Queens, New York. Unmarked since his death in 1955, his grave was re-consecrated in 2009 with a headstone paid for with funds raised by an event arranged by the James P. Johnson Foundation, Spike Wilner, and Scott Brown.

In 2020, Johnson's song "Carolina Shout" was added to the Grammy Hall of Fame.

== Film scores ==
Some of Johnson's compositions were used in a number of movies as film scores.

A partial list includes:

Year	Film	Starring	Songs
1929	The Show of Shows	John Barrymore; Douglas Fairbanks Jr. Myrna Loy	"Your Love is All I Crave"
1933	Dancing Lady	Joan Crawford; Clark Gable; Fred Astaire	"Alabama Swing"
1938	The Big Broadcast of 1938	W. C. Fields; Dorothy Lamour; Bob Hope	"Charleston"
1939	The Roaring Twenties	James Cagney; Humphrey Bogart	"If I Could Be with You (One Hour Tonight)"
1942	Casablanca	Humphrey Bogart; Ingrid Bergman; Dooley Wilson	"If I Could Be with You (One Hour Tonight)"
1943	Stormy Weather	Lena Horne; Cab Calloway; Fats Waller; Dooley Wilson	"There's No Two Ways About Love"
1946	It's a Wonderful Life	James Stewart; Donna Reed; Lionel Barrymore	"Charleston"
1947	The Man I Love	Ida Lupino; Robert Alda	"If I Could Be with You (One Hour Tonight)"
1949	Flamingo Road	Joan Crawford	"If I Could Be with You (One Hour Tonight)"
1957	The Joker Is Wild	Frank Sinatra	"If I Could Be with You (One Hour Tonight)"
1974	The Great Gatsby	Robert Redford; Mia Farrow; Bruce Dern; Sam Waterston; Karen Black	"Charleston"
1991	Rambling Rose	Laura Dern; Robert Duvall	"If I Could Be with You (One Hour Tonight)"
1991	Billy Bathgate	Dustin Hoffman; Bruce Willis; Nicole Kidman	"The Mule Walk"
1994	Cobb	Tommy Lee Jones; Lolita Davidovich	"Bleeding Hearted Blues"
2001	The Majestic	Jim Carrey	"Blue Note Boogie"
2003	Alex & Emma	Kate Hudson; Luke Wilson	"Charleston"
2006	Southland Tales	Dwayne Johnson	"If I Could Be with You (One Hour Tonight)"
2007	Perfect Stranger	Halle Berry; Bruce Willis	

== Further reading and listening ==
- Schiff, David: A Pianist with Harlem on His Mind, The New York Times, February 16, 1992 (A portrait and review of the re-premier of Johnson's Harlem Symphony, among other works, as realized by conductor Marin Alsop, pianist Leslie Stifleman, and The Concordia Orchestra.)
- Scott E. Brown, A Case of Mistaken Identity: The Life and Music of James P. Johnson, Scarecrow Press, 1984. ISBN 0810818876 (Part of a series published by the Institute of Jazz Studies at Rutgers University. This began as Brown's senior thesis at Yale, 1982, and was expanded into book form while he was in medical school. It is supplemented with an extensive pre-CD era discography by Robert Hilbert.)
- Brown, Scott E. (2026). Speakeasies to Symphonies: The Jazz Genius of James P. Johnson. University Press of Mississippi. ISBN 9781496860644. Accompanying YouTube playlist, compiled by Mark Borowsky (@stridedude)
- Good Buddies: Waller and Johnson, Jazz Rhythm Program No. 174, www.jazzhotbigstep.com, 2004 (produced by Dave Radlauer, with guest, Mark Borowsky, James P. Johnson Foundation)
- Celebrating James P. Johnson, Jazz Rhythm Programs No. 137 138, 139, www.jazzhotbigstep.com, 2003 (produced by Dave Radlauer, with guest, Mark Borowsky, James P. Johnson Foundation)
- Todd Mundt Show, Radio Program, NPR, January 2, 2003 (Includes a 25-minute interview with Mark Borowsky of the James P. Johnson Foundation and a discussion about the discovery and performance of Johnson and Langston Hughes' operetta, De-Organizer. Long thought to have been lost, a score of singing parts was discovered by the University of Michigan jazz pianist and scholar, Prof James Dapogny. Dapogny's restoration was performed in 2003, followed in 2006 by a Dapogny restored version of "Dreamy Kid".)
- Fats Waller and James P. Johnson: Student/Teacher, Protege/Master, Colleagues/Best Friends. Lecture, by Mark Borowsky, Robert Pinsker, James P. Johnson Foundation. Fats Waller Centennial Conference, Institute of Jazz Studies, Rutgers University, May 8, 2004.
- From Joplin to Blake to Johnson: A Ragtime Triple Play. Lecture, by Robert Pinsker, Mark Borowsky, James P. Johnson Foundation. Sutter Creek Ragtime Festival, August 2002
- BBC Radio 3 Composer of the Week, November 9–13, 2020
- Riccardo Scivales: Jazz Piano: The Left Hand (Bedford Hills, New York: Ekay Music, 2005). A method covering practically all the left-hand techniques (Johnson's too) used in the history of jazz piano, with hundreds of musical examples.
