= J. Leubrie Hill =

American composer and writer (died 1916)

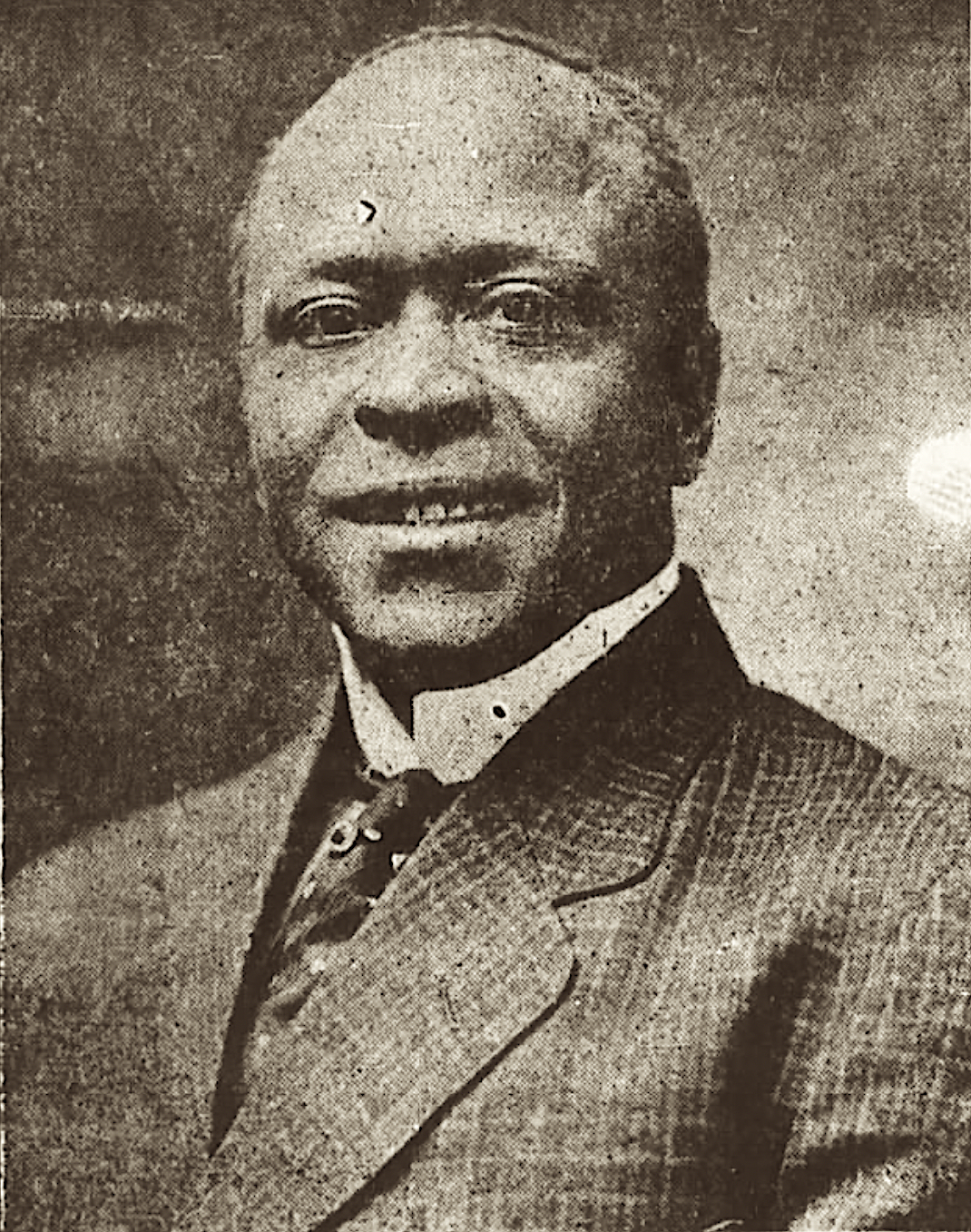
J. Leubrie Hill

John Leubrie Hill (1873 – August 30, 1916) was a composer and writer. He wrote songs and musicals.

== Life and career ==
The son of John W. and Rachel Hill, John Leubrie Hill was born in New Orleans, Louisiana in 1873. He grew up in Memphis, Tennessee where he was also educated as a musician. He began his career as a singer and pianist touring through the American South. By 1896 he had formed a partnership with fellow Tennessee performer and composer Alex Rogers. In the late 1890s he formed a vaudeville duo act with Shepard N. Edmonds; one of the earlier acts in that medium to feature two black entertainers.

In 1902 Hill moved to New York City where he established himself as a Tin Pan Alley songwriter. In New York he continued to work collaboratively as a songwriter with Alex Rogers; notably contributing some songs to the landmark African American musical In Dahomey (1903) as one of their early New York projects.

He was in Rufus Rastus (1906), Mr. Lode of Koal (1909) and Bandanna Land (1908). He wrote the musical Hello Paris with J. Rosamond Johnson. He also wrote the musical My Friend from Dixie. He formed the Colored Vaudeville Exchange and in 1913 he produced and starred in My Friend from Kentucky at the Lafayette Theatre in Harlem. It was an influential hit with vibrant dance numbers that launched a trend of New York City theater patrons heading uptown for shows.

Florenz Ziegfeld who produced of the Ziegfeld Follies purchased the rights for some of the show's songs including "At the Ball, That's All". Parts of the show were also used in Darktown Follies, debuting in 1914.

His song "At the Ball, That's All" was recorded by various artists on several record labels. It was also used in Laurel and Hardy's 1937 film Way Out West, where the duo perform a dance to the accompaniment of a cowboy vocal quartet with guitar.

The New York Public Library has an image of him with "his Darktown Follies".

Hill died in New York City on August 30, 1916.

== Discography ==
- "Rock me in the cradle of love", from Ziegfeld follies (1914)
- "Eddie Leonard's Molasses candy" (1910)
- "Daffy-down-dilly : characteristic march two-step" (1907)
- "At the ball that's all"

== Filmography ==
- Lime Kiln Field Day (1913)
