= Bandanna Land =

1908 musical

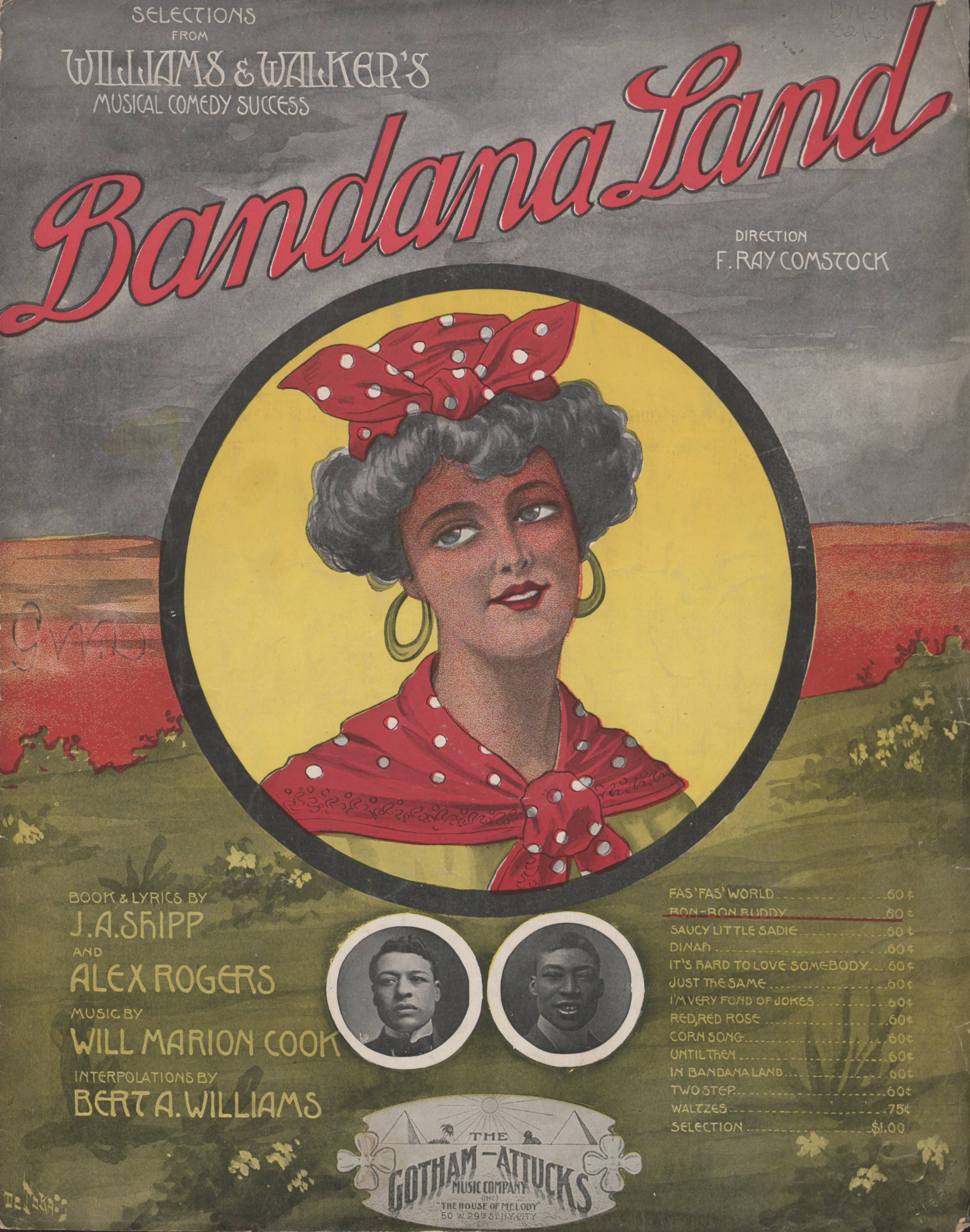
- Sheet music cover of the song "Bon Bon Buddy" which closed Act 2
- Music: Will Marion Cook (primarily)
- Lyrics: Alex Rogers, Jesse A. Shipp, Mord Allen, others
- Book: Alex Rogers, Jesse A. Shipp
- Setting: Amos Simmons' home; Off Fellows' Hall; "Bandanna Land"
- Premiere: February 3, 1908: Majestic Theatre
- Productions: 1908 Broadway

Bandanna Land (also known as In Bandanna Land) is a musical from 1908. The book was written by Jesse A. Shipp, lyrics by Alex Rogers (Note: Alex (aka Alec) Rogers (né Alexander Claude Rogers; 1876–1930) – on May 17, 1902, in Manhattan – married Lavinia ("Viney") Rogers (née Lavinia Wampa Ellis; 1879–1940). According to the 1940 US Census, Lavinia was a foster sister, and close friend for 38 years, of actress Ida Day (née Ida Daisy Day; 1879–1940). Lavinia and Ida While lived together in Brooklyn. In 1940, they died 10 days apart. Ida died November 8, 1940, and was buried November 13 at The Evergreens Cemetery in Brooklyn. Lavinia died November 18, 1940, and was buried November 22 at The Evergreens.) and music composed primarily by Will Marion Cook. Created by and featuring African Americans, it was the third musical written by the team whose previous works included In Dahomey (1902) and Abyssinia (1906). It was the last show featuring the duo of Bert Williams and George Walker, comedians who starred in these musicals. Walker became ill during the post-Broadway tour and died in 1911.

== Plot ==
Setting: Georgia

Skunkton Bowser, a performer who does one-night-stands with a minstrel show, inherits $25,000 as a bequest from the man who formerly enslaved Bowser's father. His educated friend, Bud Jenkins, appoints himself as guardian of Bowser and creates a park for African Americans called "Bandanna Land". Jenkins assists in selling the park to a railroad company that does not like the presence of the African Americans. Despite Jenkins, Bowser is determined to receive his fair share of the profits of the sale.

== Characters and original Broadway cast ==
Based on the cast list from IBDB.

- Amos Simmons, owner of the property that all the fuss is about – Alex Rogers
- Cynthia, niece of Amos – Bertha Clarke
- Sophie Simmons, Amos's wife – Hattie McIntosh
- Dinah Simmons, Amos's daughter – Aida Overton Walker
- Pete Simmons, Amos's brother – Charles H. Moore
- Mandy Lou, a niece of Amos Simmons – Abbie Mitchell Cook (listed in Billboard review but not listed on IBDB)
- Julia Smothers, Dinah's schoolmate – Maggie Davis
- Sue Higgins, Dinah's schoolmate – Bessie Vaughan
- Amelia Green, Dinah's schoolmate – Bessie Brady
- Sis Black, a child – Marguerite Ward
- Babe Brown, Dinah's schoolmate – Ida Day (née Ida Daisy Day; 1879–1940)
- Becky White, a child – Katie Jones
- Angelina Diggs, teacher and president of the R.L.B.H. Society – Ada Rex
- Fountain Lewis, owner of the Carrolton Hotel barber shop – R. Henri Strange
- Si Springer, a janitor – Mord Allen (né Junius Mordecai Allen; 1875–1953), an African American poet
- Mr. Wilson, a major shareholder – James E. Lightfoot
- Mr. Jones, a major shareholder – Sterling Rex
- Sandy Turner, chairman of the corporation meeting – J. Leubrie Hill
- Deacon Sparks – Lloyd G. Gibbs
- Jack Dimery, Uncle Apple Jack – George Catlin
- Sid Morgan, a board member – James M. Thomas
- Dick Beel, a board member – H. B. Guillaume
- Bill Hayden, a board member – Angelo Hously
- Jim Strode, a board member – Charles Hall
- Mr. White, a board member – Arthur Payne
- Abe Milum, a board member – L. H. Saulsbury
- Mr. Black, a board member – J. P. Reed
- Mr. Brown, a board member – G. Henry Tapley
- Mr. Green, a board member – Frank H. Williams
- Sleepy Jim Harper, a board member – W. H. Chapelle
- Mr. Collins, secretary of the corporation – Henry Troy
- Mose Blackstone, lawyer and founder of the T.S.C.R. Co. – Jesse A. Shipp
- Skunkton Bowser, the missing heir – Bert Williams
- Bud Jenkins, Bon Bon Buddie – George Walker
- Sadie Tompkins – Lavinia "Viney" Rogers (née Lavinia Wampa Ellis; 1879–1940), formerly Mrs. Walter Gaston; Lavinia, in 1902, married lyricist and actor Alex Rogers of this production
- Fred Lewis, nephew of Fountain Lewis – Henry Troy
- Members of the entertainment, Finance and Decoration Committees: Misses Guiguesse, Clough, Jordan, Bluford, Ellis, Payne, Fowler, Young, Martin, M. Brown, L. Brown and Banks.
- Doc Foster, a conjurer – Lavinia Rogers
- Doc Foster, a conjurer – J. Francis Mores
- Jim Harper Jr. – Ada Vaughan

== Musical numbers ==
Song list from IBDB.

Act 1

- "Corn Song" – Mandy Lou, Male Quartette and Chorus
- "Kinky" – (lyrics by Mord Allen) Dinah Simmons and Kinky Girls
- "'Tain't Gwine to Be No Rain" – Amos Simmons and Male Chorus
- "Exhortation" – Deacon Sparks and Male Chorus
- "Until Then" – Skunkton Bowser, Bud Jenkins and Male Chorus

ACT 2

- "Minuet" – Mose Blackstone
- "Red, Red Rose" (lyrics by Alex Rogers) – Mandy Lou
- "When I Was Sweet Sixteen" (music by J. Leubrie Hill; lyrics by Mord Allen) – Angelina Diggs
- "It's Hard to Love Somebody" (When Your Somebody Don't Love You) (music by Chris Smith; lyrics by Cecil Mack) – Dinah Simmons
- "Just the Same"
- "Somewhere" (music by Joe Jordan and Frank H. Williams; lyrics by Joe Jordan and Frank H. Williams) – Mr. Collins and Chorus
- "Late Hours" (music by Bert A. Williams; lyrics by David Kempner) – Mose Blackstone
- "Bon Bon Buddie" (lyrics by Alex Rogers) – Bud Jenkins

ACT 3

- "Ethiopia" (music by Al Johns) – Dinah Simmons and Girls
- "Me to Me Is Me" – Mose Blackstone

== Production ==
=== Pre-Broadway ===
One of the first notices of Bandanna Land is in a two-line notice in Billboard dated July 1, 1905. The notice, part of an assemblage of "notes and gossip of Chicago and the Northwest," says that the show as well as "Absinthe Frappe" are "winning many laurels."

By 1907 Williams and Walker began working up the show based on the vaudeville act. A May 1907 notice has Williams and Walker performing a twenty-minute skit called On the Road to Bandanna Land at the Chesnut Theatre in Philadelphia. The review mentions songs such as "Friend of the Family," "A Cousin of Mine," and "Just One Word of Consolation," none of which made it into the version produced on Broadway nine months later.

By the end of the summer the show began a four-month pre-Broadway tour, starting September 1907 and lasting through the beginning of February 1908:

- September 12, 1907: Collingwood Opera House in Poughkeepsie, N.Y.
- September 13: Rand's Opera House in Troy, N.Y.
- October 1: Colonial Theatre in Akron, Ohio
- October 9: Danville, Illinois
- October 10: Champaign, Illinois
- October 11: Springfield, Illinois
- October 12: Quincy, Illinois
- October 13–19: Kansas City, Missouri
- October 20: Leavenworth, Kansas
- October 21–22: St. Joseph, Missouri
- October 23: Topeka, Kansas
- October 24: Lawrence, Kansas
- October 25: Joplin, Missouri
- October 26: Sedalia, Missouri
- October 2-November 9: St. Louis, Missouri
- November 10–30: Chicago, Illinois
- December 1–7: Milwaukee, Wisconsin
- December 8–14: Louisville, Kentucky
- December 15–21: Cincinnati, Ohio
- December 23: Bijou in Pittsburgh, Pennsylvania,
- December 29-January 1, 1908: Toledo, Ohio
- January 2–4: Grand Rapids, Michigan
- January 6–11: Detroit, Michigan
- January 13–18: Toronto, Ontario, Canada
- January 20-February 2: Philadelphia, Pennsylvania

=== Broadway ===
After touring the east coast, Bandanna Land opened on Broadway at the Majestic Theatre in New York City on February 3, 1908. It ran for 89 performances, closing on April 18, 1908.

== Post-Broadway ==
Following its close on Broadway, Bandanna Land played at the Majestic Theatre in Brooklyn from April 20 until about May 30.

While Williams and Walker were performing in London in July 1908, there was talk of a London production of Bandanna Land. Instead, the duo performed The Guardian and the Heir, "a boiled-down version" of Bandanna Land.

Back on American soil, Bandanna Land opened August 14, 1908 at the "Grand Opera House".

It played a special engagement at the Academy of Music in Baltimore, Maryland.

For the week of April 5, 1909, the show returned to the Majestic Theatre in Brooklyn, N.Y.

In February 1909, Bandanna Land played at the "Masonic Theater" in Louisville, Kentucky. The run was so successful that potential attendees had to be turned away. During the run George Walker became ill (an illness which eventually led to his death). He left the company on February 24, 1910. His departure ended Bandanna Land's run as well as the partnership of Williams and Walker.

== Critical reception ==
During the pre-Broadway tour, one critic wrote "Williams and Walker have a vehicle which is making them popular, and incidentally, some of the much-needed mazuma. Their eccentric style of character-drawing produced what is, no doubt, the highest type of negro achievement on the stage to-day. The company is made up of some clever people."

Billboard's unnamed reviewer wrote: "In the first act there is a meeting of a corporation, which is so finished in every detail of costuming, grouping and by-play, that it is only after the fall of the curtain, that you realize how much has gone into its current presentment...If Belasco could get half the atmosphere into a production that Bandanna Land produces in such abundance, he would be rejoiced."

The review in Variety began: "'Bandanna Land' is a real artistic achievement, representing as it does a distinct advancement in negro minstrelsy. Realizing, perhaps, that the white public is chronically disinclined to accept the stage negro in any but a purely comedy vein and having at the same time a natural desire to be something better than the conventional colored clown whose class mark is a razor and an ounce or two of cut glass, Williams and Walker have approached the delicate subject from a new side....'Bandanna Land' has found substantial success at the Majestic Theatre, where it is now in its fourth week with an almost unbroken record of capacity business. No small part of the credit for this result is due to Will Marion Cook, who wrote the music, and to the splendid singing organization.The score is full of surprises, crisp little phrases that stick in the mind and are distinctly whistleable, and several of the lyrics that go with them are excellently done."

The unnamed author of the brief New York Times review wrote that Walker and Williams would have been positively received if they had done only the cakewalk and dance that concluded act 2. The reviewer wrote that the conclusion of the cakewalk received a "response from the audience that was utterfly deafening" and had to be encored thirteen times." The critic noted that, in act 1, the land corporation "with a very big name" was set up like a minstrel show, with the corporation's president functioning as an interlocuter and two board members as end men.
