= Hoboken Four =

American musical group

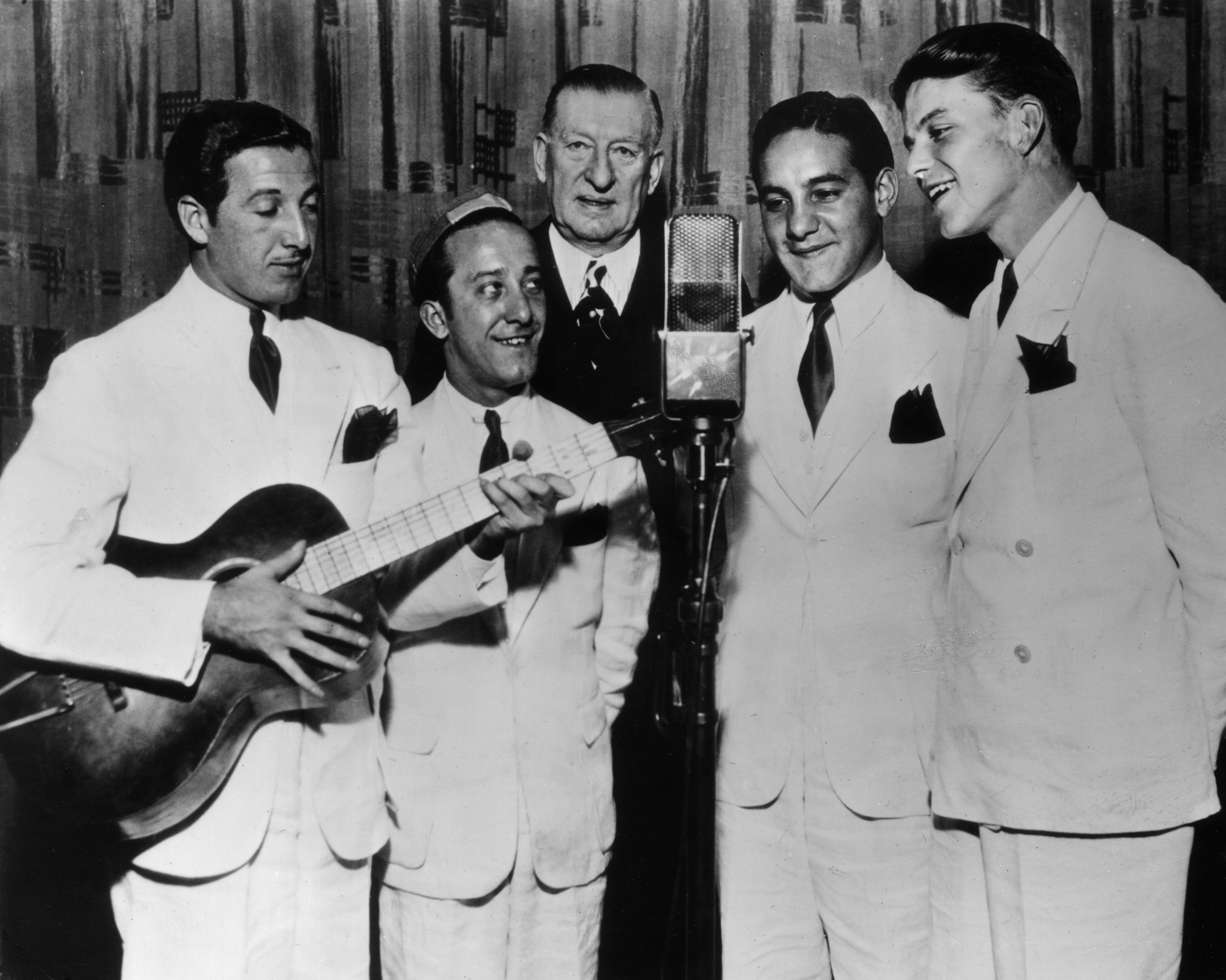
Sinatra (far right) with the Hoboken Four on Major Bowes' Amateur Hour. Major Bowes is in the center.

The Hoboken Four was an American musical quartet formed in 1935, uniting a trio of Italian-American musicians who called themselves the 3 Flashes with aspiring singer Frank Sinatra. The trio had been based in Hoboken, New Jersey, before meeting Sinatra in 1934, after which Sinatra drove them and their instruments to gigs outside the city and occasionally performed with them. Following their winning performance on the Major Bowes Amateur Hour on September 8, 1935, the newly formed quartet embarked on a seven-month tour of the central and western United States and Canada with one of Major Bowes' touring companies. Tensions between the quartet members escalated, however, to the point that Sinatra was regularly beaten by the other members, and he quit the tour halfway through. He returned to Hoboken to pursue a solo career, while the rest of the group disbanded after the tour ended.

== History ==
The original trio was composed of three Italian Americans who were childhood friends on Sixth Street in Hoboken, New Jersey: James (Jimmy Skelly) Petrozelli, Patrick (Patty Prince) Principe, and Fred (Freddie Tamby) Tamburro. They worked as truck drivers and sang and danced as a group. They had a regular weekend set at the Rustic Cabin, a roadhouse located on U.S. Route 9W near Alpine, New Jersey, about 15 miles (24 km) from Hoboken.

In 1934, the 19-year-old Frank Sinatra attached himself to the group, offering to drive them and their instruments to gigs outside Hoboken in his sports car. According to Tamburro: "Frank hung around us like we were gods or something. We took him along for one simple reason: Frankie-boy had a car. He used to chauffeur us around". Sinatra also acted as their unofficial manager, "renting the four of them to schools and club bands, with himself as the featured singer for a small additional fee". Sinatra had larger ambitions than being a manager or driver: he wanted to sing on stage, and performing with the 3 Flashes was the break he sought.

== Expansion to a quartet ==
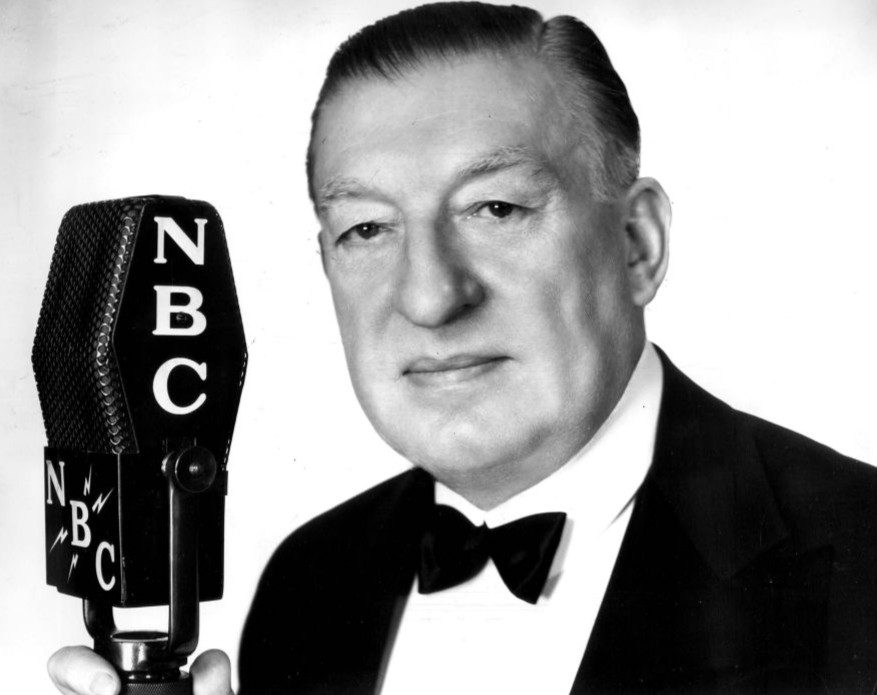
Edward Bowes, emcee of the Major Bowes Amateur Hour, in a March 1935 publicity photo

In September 1935 the 3 Flashes decided to audition for the Major Bowes Amateur Hour, a radio show that encouraged listeners to vote for their favorite act either by calling the station or sending a postcard. The act that gained the most votes won the opportunity to go on a road tour with one of Major Bowes' touring companies. Sinatra also decided to audition as a solo singer. While the trio and the singer were accepted separately, Major Bowes felt it wouldn't do to promote two acts from the same town and put them together as a quartet which he renamed the Hoboken Four. According to another version of the story, it was Sinatra's mother, Dolly, who persuaded the trio to accept Sinatra as a permanent member.

Appearing on the September 8, 1935 program, broadcast from the Capitol Theater in New York City, the quartet was introduced by Major Bowes as "singing and dancing fools". When asked to introduce themselves, each of the 3 Flashes cited their places of work, "when they were not out of work". When it was Sinatra's turn, Tamburro joked, "This feller here has never worked at all". Sinatra said, "I'm Frank. We're looking for a job. How about it? Everyone that's ever heard us, likes us. We think we're pretty good".

The group sang "Shine" by the Mills Brothers, and Sinatra performed "Night and Day" by Cole Porter. The group won the contest hands down; it was claimed that over 40,000 calls were received, the biggest response in the program's history. The following month, the group appeared in two short films produced by Major Bowes, The Nightclub and The Big Minstrel Act. In the latter film, the singers wore blackface. The shorts aired at Radio City Music Hall.

The Hoboken Four returned to compete several times on the Major Bowes Amateur Hour, calling themselves by different names each time, including the Secaucus Cockamamies, the Bayonne Bacalas, the Jive Four, and the Jolly Jersey Gypsies of Song. They won each contest. During his live performance at the Sands in 1966, Sinatra said that Major Bowes had to change the name to fool other contenders and the audience from realizing it was the same winning group competing against a fresh pack of amateurs. Sinatra often joked about the dozens of names his group was given and how Major Bowes kept rigging the show for them to win.

== National tour ==
In the winter of 1935–1936 the Hoboken Four embarked on a seven-month bus and train tour of vaudeville theaters in the central and western United States and Canada with one of Major Bowes' touring companies. Each member received $50 per week, plus meals, which was more money than any of them had ever earned before. They performed 35 shows per week in 39 states. Songs that were added to their repertoire included "The Way You Look Tonight" and "A Fine Romance".

The grind of constant traveling and lodging in substandard accommodations generated tension among the quartet members. At one stop, Sinatra either started giggling on stage or cracked a joke about Tamburro on stage, and Tamburro decked him after the show. Sinatra's talent and self-confidence were evident to everyone in the touring company, as well as his ability to attract female fans, and Tamburro and Petrozelli began taking out their frustrations by beating up Sinatra from time to time. Before the end of 1935, Sinatra had had enough. He quit the tour and returned home to Hoboken.

The original 3 Flashes continued with the tour as the Hoboken Trio, but soon decided to call it quits themselves. Petrozelli and Principe found jobs in Keansburg, New Jersey, while Tamburro went back to being a truck driver with an occasional singing gig.
