= A Porter's Love Song to a Chambermaid =

1930 jazz standard by James P. Johnson and Andy Razaf

Single by Jimmy Johnson and His Orchestra
- Published: 1930
- Released: 1931
- Recorded: March 25, 1931
- Genre: Jazz
- Label: Columbia
- Composer: James P. Johnson
- Lyricist: Andy Razaf

"A Porter's Love Song to a Chambermaid" is a jazz standard song with music by James P. Johnson and lyrics by Andy Razaf first published in 1930. It was composed for the musical "The Kitchen Mechanics Revue" "a critique of political economy you can dance to." a "plotless but tightly themed musical celebrating male and female service workers as Harlem's fountain of wealth, sanity, pleasure and art,"

The song has been recorded many times over the years, Roy Milton and His Solid Senders recorded a R&B version in 1947.

== Discography ==
- Andy Razaf with Jimmy Johnson and His Orchestra, 3/25/31, Columbia, 14668-D
- Fats Waller and his Rhythm, May 16, 1934
- Red Norvo And His Orchestra featuring Mildred Bailey, 1936, Columbia
