= William H. Tyers =

American composer, orchestrator, conductor (1870–1924)

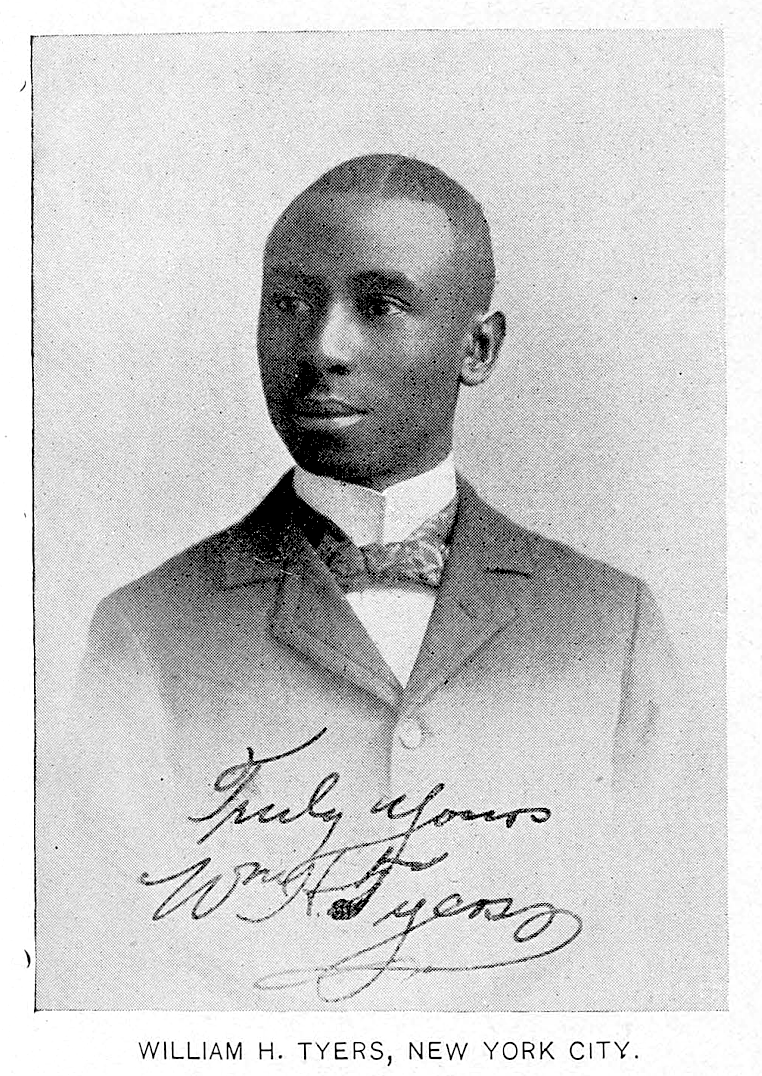
William Henry Tyers, c. 1901

William Henry Tyers (March 27, 1870 – April 18, 1924) was an American musician and conductor. He was among the new generation of black musicians who arrived in New York City after 1898, and was known for his Ragtime piano music.

== Early life and education ==
William Henry Tyers was born on March 27, 1870, in Petersburg, Virginia. As a child he moved to New York City with his family. He showed musical skills early in his life. His first popular composition was called the "Bugle Call", and it made him known in New York City.

He accepted the position of director of a theatrical company, which allowed him to visit nearly all the larger cities of Europe. While he was in Hamburg, Germany, he studied under the composer, Gaspari.

== Career ==
Starting at age 21, he was a member of the Musical Mutual Protective Union of New York City, and one of the few African American members.

After he returned to the United States, he was employed by F. A. Mills Music Publisher as pianist, arranger and proofreader of all the music published. He remained at F. A. Mills for two years. Followed by work at Joseph W. Stern & Co. of New York City.

Tyers arranged the songs for The Policy Players, Bert Williams, and George Walker's second New York City musical. Some of his work was published by Gotham-Attucks Music Publishing Company.
