= Darktown Follies =

Series of musical revues

The Darktown Follies were a series of musical revues staged in Harlem at the Lafayette Theatre from 1913 through 1916. All of the revue's creators were black, and it was one of the earliest musical revues to feature an all-black cast. Most of the music and lyrics written for the various reviews were created by J. Leubrie Hill and Will Vodery. Hill was also a major contributor to the musical books written for the revues, along with the writer Alex C. Rogers. Part of the age leading up to the Harlem Renaissance, the revue attracted diverse audiences from all over the city of New York. The theatre impresario Florenz Ziegfeld Jr. attended performances, and purchased some of the content of the Darktown Follies for use in his Broadway musical revue, Ziegfeld Follies.

The first Darktown Follies revue was staged in 1913 under the title The Darktown Follies in 'My Friend from Kentucky' . This was followed by The Darktown Follies in 'My Friend From Dixie' and The Darktown Follies in 'Here and There' . The musical revues were organized into three acts.

The revues were notable for popularizing several new dances. They brought the Ballin' the Jack dance and the Texas Tommy (a predecessor of the lindy hop) to a New York City stage and its success influenced musicals that followed.

== See also ==
- Minstrel show
- Coon song
- A Trip to Coontown
- Broadway Rastus
- Shuffle Along
