= Carolina Shout =

Song performed by James P. Johnson

Single by James P. Johnson
- B-side: Carolina Shout was the b-side of "Keep Off The Grass"
- Released: 1922
- Recorded: October 18, 1921
- Genre: Stride
- Length: 3:19
- Label: Okeh Records
- Songwriter: James P. Johnson

Audio sample
- "Carolina Shout": file; help

"Carolina Shout" is a song written by James P. Johnson. Johnson's 1921 phonograph recordings of his own compositions, including "Carolina Shout" as well as "Harlem Strut", "Keep Off the Grass" and "Worried and Lonesome Blues" were, along with Jelly Roll Morton's Gennett recordings of 1923, among the first jazz piano solos to be put on record.

"Carolina Shout", composed around 1918, is a technically challenging piano writing that became a test-piece for contemporary pianists: Duke Ellington and Fats Waller learned it note for note from the QRS Records piano roll Johnson recorded earlier than the phonograph, which was recorded on October 18, 1921 in New York City and released by Okeh Records (Okeh 4495).

In 2020 "Carolina Shout" was added to the Grammy Hall of Fame.
