= Charleston (1923 song) =

1923 song by Cecil Mack and James P. Johnson

The Charleston
- Dance tune by James P. Johnson
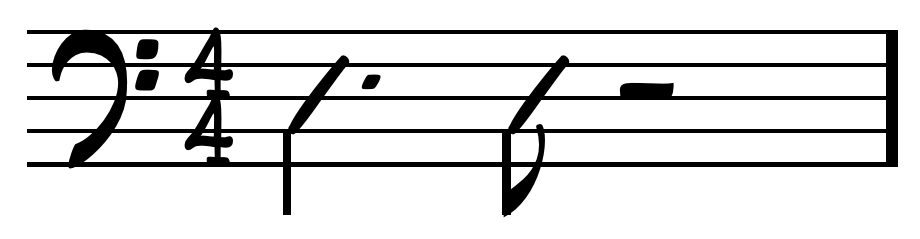
- "Charleston" rhythm
- Genre: Jazz
- Style: Stride piano
- Text: by Cecil Mack
- Composed: 1923

Premiere
- Date: October 29, 1923
- Location: New Colonial Theatre, New York

"The Charleston" is a jazz composition that was written to accompany the Charleston dance. It was composed in 1923, with lyrics by Cecil Mack and music by James P. Johnson, a composer and early leader of the stride piano school of jazz piano.

"Charleston"
A 1923 recording by Arthur Gibbs and His Gang

The song was featured in the American black Broadway musical comedy show Runnin' Wild, which had its premiere at the New Colonial Theatre in New York on October 29, 1923. The music of the dockworkers from South Carolina inspired Johnson to compose the music. The dance known as the Charleston came to characterize the times. Lyrics, though rarely sung (an exception is Chubby Checker's 1961 recording), were penned by Cecil Mack, himself one of the most accomplished songwriters of the early 1900s. The song's driving rhythm, basically the first bar of a 3-2 clave, came to have widespread use in jazz comping and musicians still reference it by name. Harmonically, the song features a five-chord ragtime progression (I-III^{7}-VI^{7}-II^{7}-V^{7}-I).

Recordings of The Charleston from 1923 entered the public domain in the United States in 2024.

== In popular culture ==
The song has been used in a number of films set in the 1920s. Ginger Rogers dances to the music in the film Roxie Hart (1942). In the movies Margie (1946) and It's a Wonderful Life (1946), the song is played during school dance scenes. In the movie Tea for Two (1950), with Doris Day and Gordon MacRae, the song is a featured production number. A version performed by Enoch Light and the Charleston City All Stars is used in Woody Allen's 2011 film Midnight in Paris, which largely takes place in the 1920s. The track "Bang Bang" from the 2013 film The Great Gatsby, performed by Will.I.Am, samples the song.

One of the most famous recordings of the song was by The Golden Gate Orchestra in 1925, which has been inducted into the National Recording Registry.

== See also ==
- List of 1920s jazz standards
