= Major Bowes =

American radio personality (1874–1946)

Edward Bowes
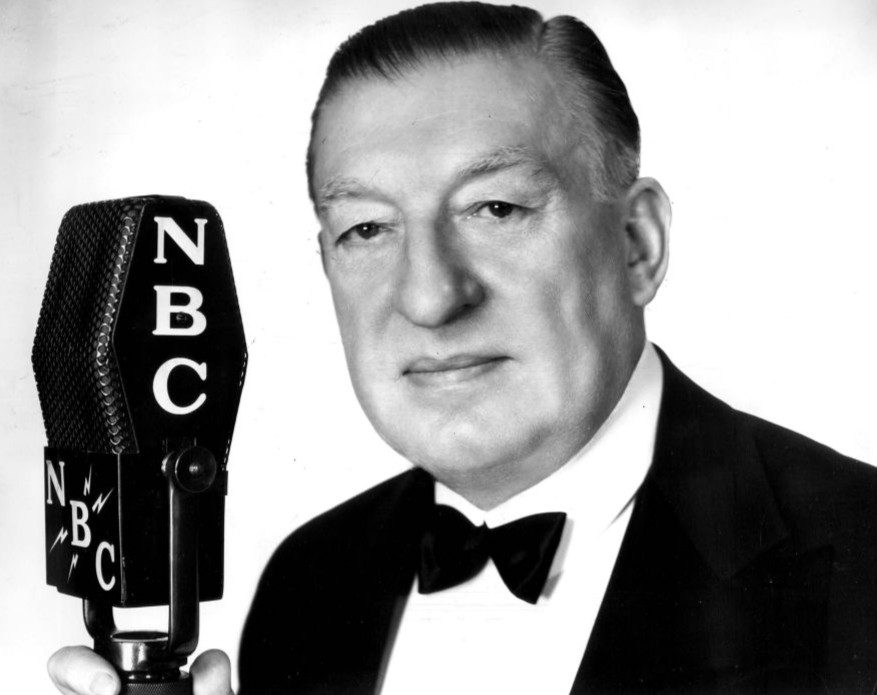
- Major Bowes as his Amateur Hour became a national radio program in 1935
- Born: June 14, 1874; San Francisco, California, U.S
- Died: June 13, 1946 (aged 71); Rumson, New Jersey, U.S
- Occupation: Radio personality
- Spouse: Margaret Illington (m. 1910; died 1934)
- Writing career
- Pen name: Major Bowes

Edward J. Bowes (June 14, 1874 – June 13, 1946), professionally known as Major Edward Bowes, was an American radio personality, theatrical manager, and film executive. Best known as the creator and longtime master of ceremonies of Major Bowes Amateur Hour, he was one of the most influential figures in early American broadcasting. Bowes helped popularize the radio talent competition format during the 1930s, discovering and launching the careers of numerous performers.

Before achieving national fame in radio, Bowes had managed the Capitol Theatre in New York, was vice-president of Goldwyn Pictures Corporation, and later oversaw radio operations connected to the formation of Metro-Goldwyn-Mayer. His radio program became a cultural phenomenon during the Great Depression, offering amateur performers a rare path to public recognition and commercial success. Bowes's authoritative on-air persona and trademark gong made him one of the most recognizable voices in American entertainment during the golden age of radio.

== Early life and radio career ==
Bowes' father died when he was six years old, and young Edward worked as he could to augment the family income. After leaving grammar school he worked as an office boy, and then went into the real estate business, until the cataclysmic 1906 San Francisco earthquake wiped out his fortune. He then moved to New York City in search of other opportunities, soon realizing that the theatrical world was lucrative, and he worked busily in New York as a musical conductor, composer, and arranger. He also produced Broadway shows such as Kindling in 1911–12 and The Bridal Path in 1913. He was married to Kindling star Margaret Illington from 1910 until her death in 1934.

He became managing director of New York's Capitol Theatre, which he ran with military efficiency. He insisted on being addressed as "Major Bowes", a nickname that sprang from his earlier military rank, though historians are divided on whether he was an active duty officer in World War I or held the rank as a member of the Officer Reserve Corps.

After his successes at the Capitol, Bowes was named vice president of Goldwyn Pictures Corporation in 1922. Following Goldwyn's 1924 merger with Metro Pictures and the Louis B. Mayer Company, Bowes assumed management of radio station WHN, formed from the combined stations WPAP, WRNY, and WQAO.

Bowes developed a radio program titled Major Bowes Capitol Family, broadcast from the Capitol Theatre. In 1934, amid widespread unemployment during the Great Depression, he launched the Original Amateur Hour on New York radio station WHN. In March 1935, he resigned as vice president of the Metro-Goldwyn-Mayer Film Corporation just before the show debuted nationally as Major Bowes Amateur Hour on the National Broadcasting Company, sponsored by Chase & Sanborn Coffee. It was an immediate success in both ratings and participation, and within a year was reportedly earning Bowes as much as $1 million annually, according to Variety. The rapid popularity of the show made him better known than most of the talent he featured. Some of his discoveries became stars, including opera stars Lily Pons, Robert Merrill, and Beverly Sills; comedian Jack Carter; pop singer Teresa Brewer; and Frank Sinatra, fronting a quartet known as the Hoboken Four when they appeared on the show in 1935.

The show consistently ranked among radio's top ten programs throughout its run. Bowes' familiar catchphrase "Round and round she goes, and where she stops nobody knows," was spoken in the familiar avuncular tones for which he was renowned, whenever it was time to spin the "wheel of fortune", the device by which some contestants were called to perform. In the early days of the show, whenever a performer was simply too terrible to continue, Bowes would stop the act by striking a gong (a device that would be revived in the 1970s by Chuck Barris's infamous The Gong Show). Bowes heard from thousands of listeners who objected to his terminating these acts prematurely, so he abandoned the gong in 1936. Nachman recorded that Bowes, "a businesslike fellow with a mirthless chuckle who, unlike most emcees, had a gift for nongab", went out of his way to make contestants feel at ease, often taking them to dinner before their appearances. Nachman credits Bowes for featuring more black entertainers than many network shows of the time.

== Death and legacy ==
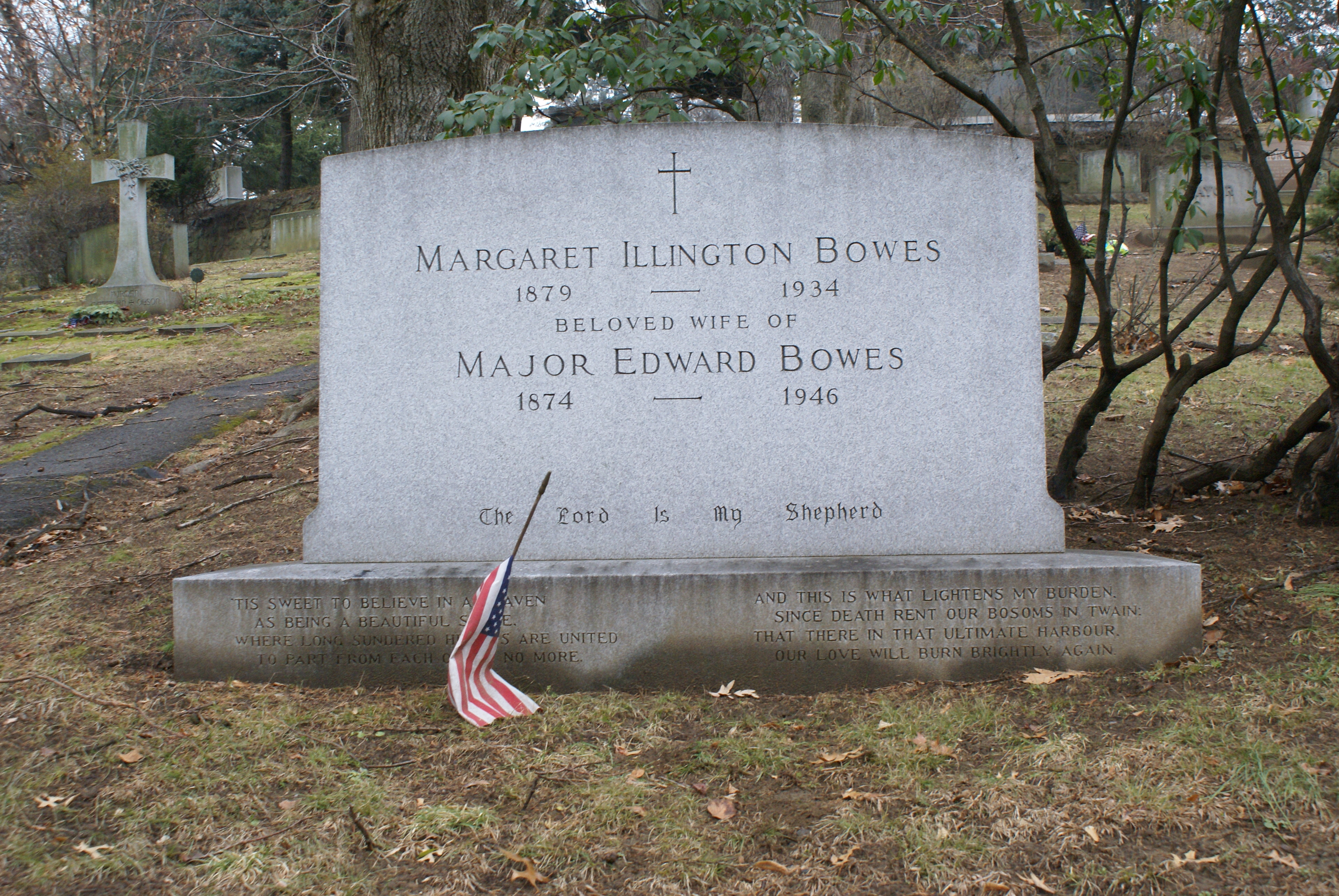
The grave of Major Edward Bowes and wife Margaret Illington in Sleepy Hollow Cemetery

Major Bowes died on June 13, 1946, the eve of his 72nd birthday at his home in the New Jersey suburb of Rumson, New Jersey. The following week, his talent coordinator Ted Mack took over hosting duties. Nineteen months after Bowes' death, on January 18, 1948, the program, with Mack as host, debuted on the DuMont Television Network. As a measure of the affection attached to Bowes' name, the show continued to be called Major Bowes' Original Amateur Hour until the 1950-51 season, when it became simply The Original Amateur Hour, and in 1955 became Ted Mack and the Original Amateur Hour. Mack continued to host the show throughout the remainder of its run, during which it ran on all four major networks, until 1970. The radio version, also with Mack, ran until 1952.

Bowes was referred to in Cab Calloway's "I Love to Singa" from the movie The Singing Kid (1936), and in the Dorothy Fields lyrics for "Never Gonna Dance," from the Astaire-Rogers film Swing Time (1936). He is also referenced in the song I'm Still Here from Sondheim's 1971 musical Follies.

Major Bowes is referenced in two The Twilight Zone episodes: "Static" (1961), where his show is heard on a mysterious radio that tunes into channels that no longer exist; his famous catch phrase "round and round she goes, where she stops nobody knows," is mentioned; as well as the episode “Young Man’s Fancy” (1962).

Bowes was a benefactor of the Catholic Church. Our Lady of Victory Church in Lower Manhattan is built on land donated by Bowes. Also, the auditorium at Archbishop Stepinac High School in White Plains is named in his honor. He donated some of the rare books at St. Joseph's Seminary, Yonkers.

Following a 1937 fire that destroyed the main house on the property, Major Bowes donated his multi-acre Ossining estate, known as "Laurel Hill," to the Lutheran Church in 1939, which operated it as an ecumenical retreat center. Run by a board of Lutheran lay persons and clergy, it was known as Major Edward Bowes Memorial Retreat, and operated year-round for students, church, and community groups in the greater New York metro area. The retreat closed in 2019 and the property was sold in 2021.
