= If I Could Be with You (One Hour Tonight) =

1926 song by James P. Johnson

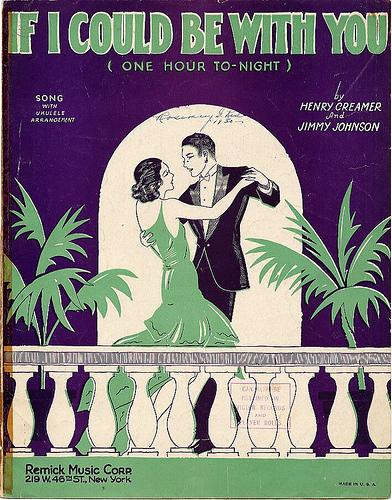
- Sheet music cover, 1926

Song
- Published: 1926
- Composer: James P. Johnson
- Lyricist: Henry Creamer

"If I Could Be with You (One Hour Tonight)" is a popular song, with music by James P. Johnson and lyrics by Henry Creamer. Published in 1926, the song was first recorded by Clarence Williams' Blue Five with vocalist Eva Taylor in 1927. It was popularized by the 1930 recording by McKinney's Cotton Pickers, who used it as their theme song and by Louis Armstrong's record for Okeh Records (catalogue No.41448), both of which featured in the charts of 1930. Armstrong's recording of "If I Could Be with You" is defined by his sparse vocal style and ornamental virtuosic trumpet-playing.

== See also ==
- List of 1920s jazz standards
