= Cecil Mack =

American composer, lyricist and music publisher (1873–1944)

- Born: Richard Cecil McPherson; November 6, 1873; Portsmouth, Virginia, USA
- Died: August 1, 1944 (aged 70) Manhattan, New York, USA
- Occupations: Composer, lyricist, music publisher

Cecil Mack (November 6, 1873 – August 1, 1944) was an American composer, lyricist and music publisher.

== Biography ==
Born as Richard Cecil McPherson in Portsmouth, Virginia, he attended the Norfolk Mission College and Lincoln University in Pennsylvania (class of 1897) before leaving to go to New York City where the 1900 Federal Census lists his occupation as a stenographer. Mack started writing song lyrics, starting with "Good Morning, Carrie" in 1901. He co-founded the Gotham-Attucks Music Publishing Company in May 1905, in New York City; it was likely the first black-owned music publishing company. In July 1906, an article in The New York Age referred to Mack as the company's "secretary and treasurer and general business director." In 1907 he wrote the lyrics for the musical The Black Politician. In 1925 he co-wrote the book for the musical Mooching Along. Mack also formed a choir, the Southland Singers, that year. In 1931 he co-wrote the music for the musical Rhapsody in Black.

=== Birth date ===
His birthdate is also given as 1880 and 1883, and an 1876 date is shown by his World War I Draft Registration card, as referenced above, and the 1900 US Census, but an 1891 Navy Enlistment Record and the 1880 Federal census both point to an 1873 birth year.

=== Personal life ===
Mack married Dr. Gertrude Curtis on April 8, 1912, in Manhattan. Curtis was a pioneering African-American dentist who practiced in Harlem. They remained married until his death. They had no children. Gertrude re-married in 1946 to Ulysses "Slow Kid" Thompson (1888–1990), a comedian.

=== Death ===
Mack died in Manhattan, aged 70. The New York Age, quoting his obituary from The Christian Science Monitor, observed, "Not even Irving Berlin exceeded the output of this talented New York Negro. His songs were as American as Stephen Foster's – one or two of them may be remembered as long – and were typically representative of the pre-radio era when fortunes were made over the 10-cent-store counters. Cecil Mack's songs were pure fun and never had an off-color line."

== Notable works ==
As lyricist, Mack's notable works include:

- "Good Morning, Carrie" (1901, co-wrote music and lyrics with J. Tim Brymn)
- "Please Go Away and Let Me Sleep" (1902)
- "He's a Cousin of Mine" (1902)
- "The Little Gypsy Maid" (1902 or before, words by Cecil Mack and Harry B. Smith, music by Will Marion Cook)
- "Zongo, My Congo Queen" (1904 or before)
- "Teasing" (1904)
- "All in down and out" (1906)
- "You're In the Right Church (But the Wrong Pew)" (1908, co-wrote music and lyrics with Chris Smith)
- "I'm Miss Hanna from Savannah" (between 1908 and 1910)
- "That's Why They Call Me Shine"(1910)
- "Way Down East" (1911) words by Cecil Mack, music by Joe Young and Harold Norman
- "Someone's Waiting Down in Tennessee" (1912, co-wrote music and lyrics with James Reese Europe)
- "Charleston" (1923, co-wrote music and lyrics with James P. Johnson)
- "Old Fashioned Love" (1923, co-wrote music and lyrics with James P. Johnson for the show Runnin' Wild)

== Bibliography ==
=== References linked to notes ===
- Anderson, Elsie Ruth (1907–1989) (compiler) (1976). "McPherson, Richard Cecil". Contemporary American Composers – A Biographical Dictionary (1st ed.). Boston: G. K. Hall & Co. p. 288. ISBN 9780816111176 – via Internet Archive. LCCN 76-2395; ISBN 0-8161-1117-0; OCLC 251647491 (all editions).
- Catalogue of Copyright Entries. Part 3, Musical Compositions, New Series. Library of Congress, Copyright Office Retrieved August 18, 2021 – via Internet Archive.
1. Vol. 2; Nos. 6–9 (February 1907) (1907). "All In Down and Out; Sorry I Ain't Got It, You Could Get It, If I Had It". © Gotham-Attucks Music Co., New York → 7 December 1906; C 136267 p. 44.
- "McPherson, Richard C.". United States Census. (June 12, 1900) (429 West 99th Street, Manhattan). Washington, D.C.: National Archives and Records Administration (microfilmed by the Genealogical Society of Utah) – via Family Search microfilm → New York → New York County → ED 212 Borough of Manhattan, Election District 18 & 17 New York City Ward 9 → image 45 of 48 → citing NARA microfilm publication T623 → line 32.
- McPherson, Richard Cecil (words); Smith, Christopher M. (1879–1949); Johnson, Billy B.; Bowman, Elmer (music) (1906). All In, Down and Out (Sorry I Ain't Got It, You Could Get It, If I Had It) (sheet music – in B♭ major). New York: Gotham-Attucks Music Company, Inc. – via Arizona State University Library Digital Repository. OCLC 872280986, 60450062.
- Morgan, Thomas Lesher (born 1952) (n.d.). "African-American Owned Music Publishing Companies – Gotham-Attucks" (Tom Morgan's Jazz & Blues & New Jazz Roots are blogs of Thomas L. Morgan of Pensacola, Florida). Pensacola, Florida: Tom Morgan's Jazz & Blues New Jazz Roots Home. OCLC 52484853, 556909934 (Jazz Roots).
1. New York Age, The (July 26, 1906). "Manhattan and Bronx" (PDF). Vol. 19, no. 40. p. 6 (column 1) – via Fultonhistory.com.
- New York Age, The (August 9, 1944). "He Wrote Dad's Favorites" (PDF) (re-printed from the Christian Science Monitor). Vol. 59, no. 13. p. 12 (column 1) – via Fultonhistory.com.
- Perfessor Bill (aka Bill Edwards; né William G. Motely III; born 1959) (n.d.). "Richard Cecil McPherson (Cecil Mack)". www.perfessorbill.com.
- "Southland Singers, The: America's Foremost Jubilee Company". Iowa City: Iowa Digital Library, University of Iowa Ligraries. 1938. Retrieved August 18, 2021.
1. UI TC 37758.
2. UI TC 41971.
3. UI TC 55420.
- World War II Draft. "Richard C. McPherson, 188 West 135th St., #2W, New York, New York". World War II Draft Registration Cards, 1942, Manhattan, New York: "McNeil, Barney Earl – Meiman, Mores" (microfilm → Record Group 147 → Box 172 → Filmed April 11, 2003 → Film Emulsion No. 2446-0157-011-01 → Film Unit No. 55586 → Project No. N-YR 0003A → Roll No. 73 → Image 418). Washington, D.C.: National Archives and Records Administration (microfilmed by the Genealogical Society of Utah) – via Ancestry.com Draft Registration Serial No. U6.
