= Aida Overton Walker =

American vaudeville performer (1880–1914)

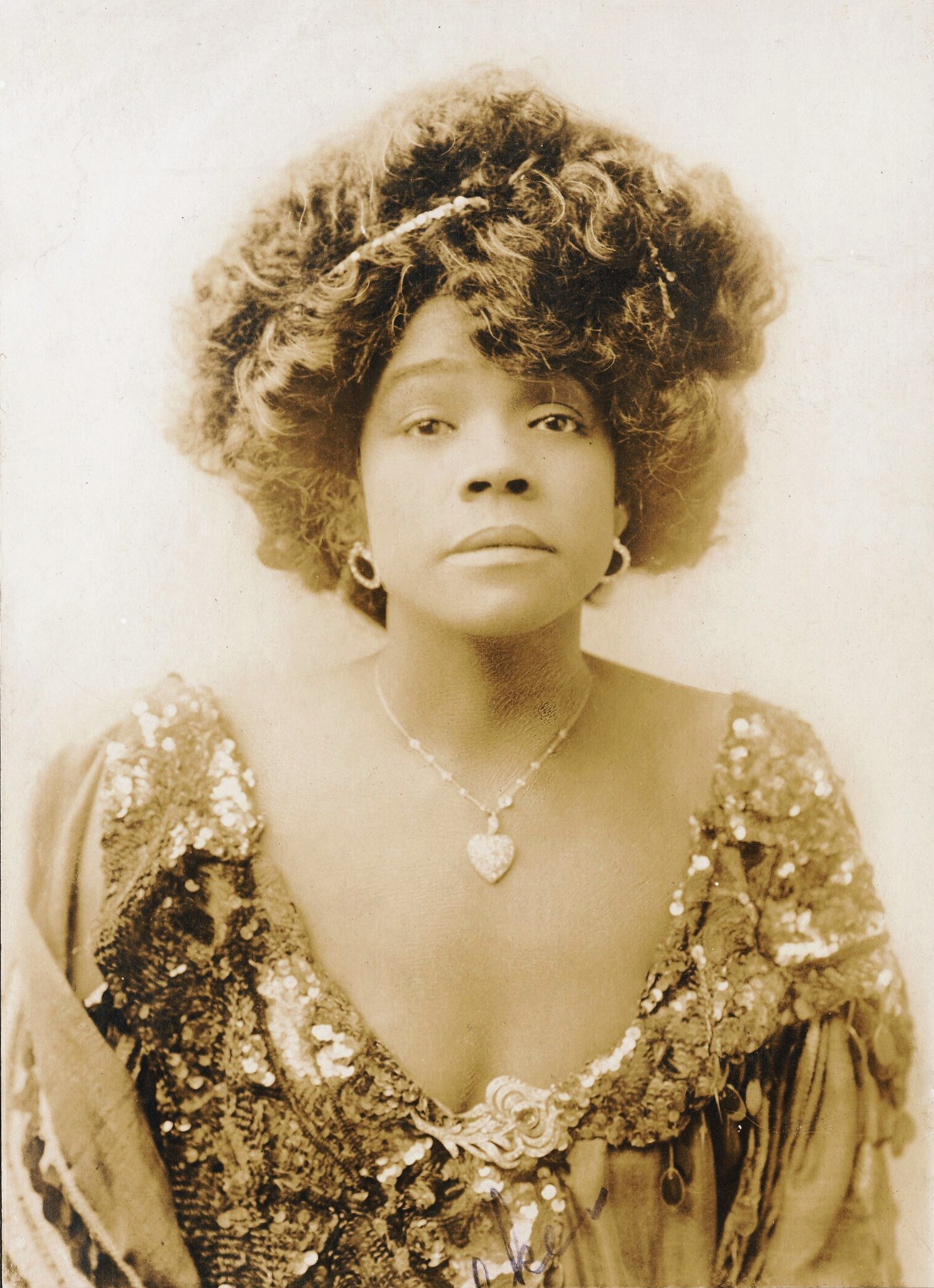
- Walker in 1907
- Born: February 14, 1880; New York City, U.S.
- Died: October 11, 1914 (aged 34); New York City, U.S.
- Occupation: Vaudeville
- Known for: Dancing and choreographing (performing)
- Spouse: George Walker

Aida Overton Walker (February 14, 1880 – October 11, 1914), also billed as Ada Overton Walker and as "The Queen of the Cakewalk", was an American vaudeville performer, actress, singer, dancer, choreographer, and wife of vaudevillian George Walker. She appeared with her husband and his performing partner Bert Williams, and in groups such as Black Patti's Troubadours. She was also a solo dancer and choreographer for vaudeville shows such as Bob Cole, Joe Jordan, and J. Rosamond Johnson's The Red Moon (1908) and S. H. Dudley's His Honor the Barber (1911).

== Biography ==
Aida Overton was born in New York City on February 14, 1880. She appears as a four-month-old infant in the US Census of 1880 with parents Moses age 24 and Pauline age 21. The census indicates her birth place was distinct from that of her parents, who were both born in North Carolina, and Aida's birth place was noted as New York. Moses' occupation was recorded as a waiter. Her name was spelled Ada, but this kind of misspelling is common in census records.

She later gained an education and considerable musical training. At 15, she joined John Isham's "Octoroons," a Black touring group. In the following years, she became a chorus member in “Black Patti's Troubadours,” where she eventually met her future husband George Walker, a vaudeville comedian. Her early career was defined by her collaborations with him and his partner Bert Williams, and together they became the major black vaudeville and musical comedy powerhouses of the era. She and George Walker married on 22 June 1899 when she was age 19 and George age 26.

Overton Walker first gained national attention in 1900 with her performance of "Miss Hannah from Savannah" in the show Sons of Ham. For the next 10 years, she was known primarily for her work in musical theater. Her song and dance made her an instant hit with audiences at the time. She, Walker, and Williams worked together on such musicals as In Dahomey (1903), In Abyssinia (1906), and Bandanna Land (1908). In 1904, after two seasons in England touring with In Dahomey, the group returned to New York.

In an October 1905 article in The Colored American Magazine, Overton Walker expressed her belief that the performing arts could have an effect on race relations, stating that "I venture to think and dare to state that our profession does more toward the alleviation of color prejudice than any other profession among colored people."

In 1908, she performed a Salome dance as part of the Bandanna Land musical revue at New York’s Grand Opera House. She reprised the performance in 1912 on Broadway at Hammerstein's Victoria Theatre. In 1910, Overton Walker joined the Smart Set Company. During this time, she began touring the vaudeville circuit as a solo act. In 1911, she performed in His Honor the Barber with Smart Set Company. Overton Walker performed as a male character in Lovie Dear, as well as in Bandanna Land, in which she took over her husband's role.

Her husband died of syphilis in 1911 in a sanitarium on Long Island. That same year she began portraying elements of her late husband's act while dressed as a man, including singing Bon Bon Buddy, for which she dressed as a man. She won great acclaim for this routine. Critics called her male impersonation "the hit of the show" which "held the audiences spellbound." Many newspapers printed cartoons of her in male attire, which became an iconic image of theatrical cross-dressing.

Walker died suddenly from kidney failure in 1914 and is mourned as the foremost African-American female stage artist.

== See also ==
- African-American musical theater

== Sources ==
- Brooks, Daphne (2006). "Divas and Diasporic Consciousness". In Brooks, Daphne (ed.). Bodies in dissent : spectacular performances of race and freedom, 1850-1910. Durham: Duke University Press. pp. 281–342. ISBN 9780822337225.
- Galindo, Brian (5 September 2013). "The Vaudeville Actress Who Refused To Be A Stereotype". BuzzFeed. Archived from the original on 8 September 2013.
- Kicha. "Aida Overton Walker (1880 – 1914)". N.p., n.d.
- Krasner, David (November 1996). "Rewriting the Body: Aida Overton Walker and the Social Formation of Cakewalking". Theatre Survey. 37 (2): 67–92. doi:10.1017/S0040557400001629. S2CID 162353178.
- Manhattan (New York City) marriage records, 1866-1937; index to all boroughs, 1866-1937, New York City Municipal Archives, New York. Family History Library microfilm 1504065.
- Seniors, Paula Marie (2009). Beyond Lift Every Voice and Sing: The Culture of Uplift, Identity, and Politics in Black Musical Theater. Columbus, OH: Ohio State University Press. ISBN 9780814211007.
- United States Census of 1880, New York City, New York County, New York State; Enumeration District 174; p37
