= David Schiff =

American composer, writer and conductor (born 1945)

David Schiff (born August 30, 1945 in New York City) is an American composer, writer and conductor whose music draws on elements of jazz, rock, and klezmer styles, showing the influence of composers as diverse as Stravinsky, Mahler, Charles Mingus, Eric Dolphy and Terry Riley. His music has been performed by major orchestras and festivals around the United States and by soloists David Shifrin, Regina Carter, David Taylor, Marty Ehrlich, David Krakauer, Nadine Asin and Peter Kogan. He is the author of books on the music of Elliott Carter, George Gershwin and Duke Ellington. His work has been honored by the League-ISCM National Composers Competition award and the ASCAP-Deems Taylor award for his book on Elliott Carter.

== Biography ==
Schiff grew up in the Bronx and New Rochelle, New York, started playing piano when he was four and composing when he was nine. He received a B.A in English literature from Columbia University in 1967 and an M.A. from Cambridge University, where he was a Kellett Fellow at Clare College, in 1970. After pursuing graduate study in English at Columbia Schiff received an MM from the Manhattan School of Music in 1974 and a DMA From the Juilliard School in 1979. Among his teachers were James Wimer, Irwin Stahl, Roger Smalley, Ludmilla Ulehla, John Corigliano, Ursula Mamlok and Elliott Carter. While studying with Carter at Juilliard, Schiff was awarded the League-ISCM National Composers Competition for his Elegy for String Quartet and also oversaw the world premiere of his opera Gimpel the Fool (libretto by I. B. Singer). Since 1980 Schiff has taught at Reed College Portland, Oregon. He is married to Cantor Judith Blanc Schiff and they have two children.

== Compositions ==
Schiff has composed works for musical theater, worship, orchestra and various chamber ensembles including large and small jazz orchestras. Principal works are:

=== Musical theater ===
- Gimpel the Fool. Opera in two acts. Libretto by I. B. Singer (Two recordings on Naxos)
- Vashti or The Whole Megillah. Chamber opera for mezzo-soprano, clarinet and piano.
- A Little Proust Opera (from All About Love). Chamber opera for mezzo-soprano, tenor and small ensemble.

=== Orchestra music ===
- Slow Dance (1989) composed for the Oregon Symphony
- Stomp (1990) composed for Concordia
- Speaking in Drums (timpani concerto) (1994) composed for the Minnesota Orchestra
- Bridge City (1996) for orchestra and blues band, written for the Oregon Symphony
- 4 Sisters (jazz violin concerto) (1997), American premiere by the Detroit Symphony
- Canti di Davide (clarinet concerto) (2001) composed for the Virginia Symphony
- Canzona for brass, percussion and strings (2005) composed for the Seattle Symphony
- Infernal (2007) composed for the Seattle Symphony
- Stomp Re-Lit (2009) composed for the American Composers Orchestra

=== Choral music ===
- Peace
- Psalm 121

=== Synagogue music ===
- Sacred Service (1983)
- Wedding service (1984)
- Psalm 150 (2008)

=== Chamber music ===
- Joycesketch II for solo viola (1981)
- Divertimento from Gimpel the Fool (1982)*
- Scenes from Adolescence (1987)*
- Solus Rex (1992) composed for the Chamber Music Society of Lincoln Center
- New York Nocturnes (2000)*
- After Hours (2001) composed for the Aspen Music Festival
- All About Love (2005)*
- Singing in the Dark (2006)*
- Nonet (2007)*
- Borscht Belt Follies (2010)*
- Class of 1915 (2012)*
- starred numbers premiered by Chamber Music Northwest, Portland Oregon.

=== Jazz ensembles ===
- Shtik (1992)
- Low Life (1998)

=== Books and articles ===
Schiff has written frequently on music for the New York Times, the Atlantic Monthly, Tempo, the Times Literary Supplement (London) and the Nation. His books include

- The Music of Elliott Carter (first edition, Eulenberg Books,1983; second edition, Faber and Cornell University Press, 1998)
- George Gershwin: Rhapsody in Blue (1997) Cambridge Music Handbook.
- The Ellington Century (2012) University of California Press.

He also has written entries on Leonard Bernstein and Elliott Carter for the New Grove Dictionary of Music and Musicians.
