= Chris Smith (composer) =

American vaudeville performer (1879–1949)

Chris Smith

Christopher M. Smith (October 12, 1879 – October 4, 1949) was an American composer and popular vaudeville performer.

== Biography ==
Smith was born in Charleston, South Carolina. He started traveling with medicine shows when he was young and joined Vaudeville, where he performed with Elmer Bowman and Jimmy Durante. He also wrote music for Bert Williams. Smith died in New York City on October 4, 1949.

== Selected works ==
Smith composed many songs, including the following:

- "Good Morning Carrie", lyrics by Cecil Mack (pseudonym of Richard Cecil McPherson), music by Smith & Euday L. Bowman; Windsor Music Co. (1901); OCLC 828523449
- "Mandy, You and Me!" Smith and James H. Burris (né James Henry Burris; 1876–1923) (w&m); Attucks Publishing Company (©1905); OCLC 53987943
- "Honky Tonky Monkey Rag" Words and Music by Chris Smith, 1911 OCLC 499139974
- "Junk Man Rag", lyrics by Smith & Ferdinand E. Mierisch, music by Charles Luckyth Roberts ("Luckey"); Jos. W. Stern & Co. (1913); OCLC 47361315
- "Fifteen Cents", Words and Music by Chris Smith, 1913
- "Ballin' the Jack", lyrics by Jim Burris (né James Henry Burris; 1876–1923), music by Smith; Jos. W. Stern & Co. (1913); OCLC 9544460
- "Never Let the Same Bee Sting You Twice", Cecil Mack (pseudonym of Richard Cecil McPherson), music by Smith; Broadway Music Corporation (1916); OCLC 10347942
- "Down in Honky Tonk Town", music & lyrics by Smith & Charles R. McCarron (1891–1919); Broadway Music Corporation (1918); OCLC 10361641
- "I've Got My Habits On", lyrics by Smith & Bob Schafer, music by Jimmie Durante; Goodman & Rose, Inc. (1921); OCLC 20267560 †
- "At the Honky-Tonk Steppers' Ball", lyrics & music by Smith & Jimmie Durante; Goodman & Rose, Inc. (1921); OCLC 44791897 †
- "The Camel Walk", lyrics by Cecil Mack & Bob Schafer; music by Smith & James Tim Brymn; Broadway Music Corporation (1925); OCLC 471589994

Note

- † – Goodman & Rose, Inc., was a New York music publishing firm founded by Frank Goodman and Justus Rose
