= Dave Radlauer =

American radio personality

Dave Radlauer is a radio broadcaster and historian specializing in early jazz. Since 1982, he has presented programs on jazz history and has received six broadcasting awards for his work. He is the radio host of radio show Jazz Rhythm.

Radlauer explores the works of well-known and obscure musicians on his radio show Jazz Rhythm. In 2009 his show received a Gabriel Award. His Jazz Rhythm website is a compendium of early jazz history, rare photos and some 500 hours of exclusive audio rarities, interviews and programs on 120 early jazz topics.

Radlauer plays traditional jazz music and interviews jazz musicians. Radlauer's research materials are being conserved as part of the Dave Radlauer Jazz Collection at the Stanford University Library archives.
