= Major Bowes Amateur Hour =

American radio talent show

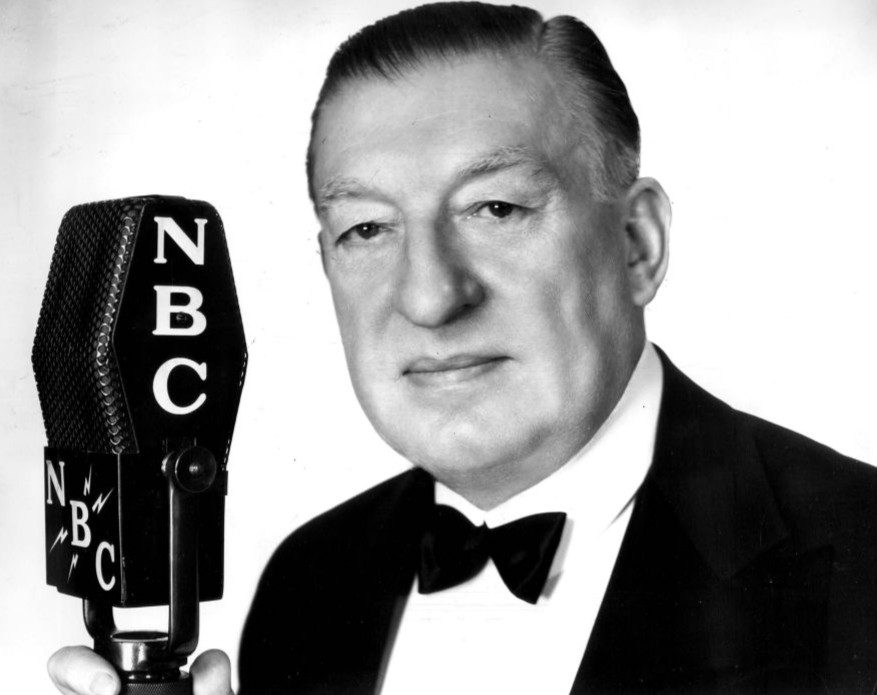
- Major Bowes as his Amateur Hour became a national radio program, 1935.
- Other names: The Original Amateur Hour, Major Bowes and His Capitol Family
- Genre: Amateur talent show, Variety show
- Running time: 60 minutes
- Country of origin: United States
- Language: English
- Home station: WHN (Apr. 1934—Mar. 1935); NBC (Mar. 1935—Sept. 1936); CBS (Sept. 1936—July 1945); ABC (Sept. 1948—Sept. 1952)
- Hosted by: Edward Bowes; Jay C. Flippen; Ted Mack
- Starring: Norman Brokenshire; Phil Carlin; Ted Cott
- Created by: Edward Bowes
- Directed by: Bob Reed
- Recording studio: New York City, New York, USA
- Original release: April 1, 1934 – September 18, 1952
- Audio format: Mono
- Sponsored by: Chase and Sanborn, Chrysler, Old Gold Cigarettes

The Major Bowes Amateur Hour was an American radio talent show broadcast in the 1930s and 1940s, created and hosted by Edward Bowes (1874–1946). Selected performers from the program participated in touring vaudeville performances, under the "Major Bowes" name. The program later transitioned to television under host Ted Mack.

== Radio ==
Major Edward Bowes and gong.

=== Major Bowes and the Original Amateur Hour ===
Bowes brought his amateur hour to the New York City radio station WHN in April 1934. On March 24, 1935, on NBC, The Chase & Sanborn Coffee Company chose this show to fill The Chase and Sanborn Hour. This arrangement lasted until September 17, 1936, when the show moved to the CBS Radio Network. The show remained on CBS for the remainder of its run on radio.

Each week, Bowes would chat with the contestants and listen to their performances. His familiar catchphrase "Round and round she goes, and where she stops nobody knows," was spoken in the familiar avuncular tones for which he was renowned, whenever it was time to spin the "wheel of fortune," the device by which some contestants were called to perform.

Bowes sent the more talented contestants on "Major Bowes" vaudeville tours, often with several units roaming the country simultaneously. Bowes presided over his radio program until his death on June 13, 1946, the day before his 72nd birthday.

Frank Sinatra was perhaps the best-known alumnus of the Bowes program, having appeared as part of the Hoboken Four quartet. Maria Callas also appeared on the program at age 11, performing as Nina Foresti when she sang a selection from Madame Butterfly.

=== Major Bowes' Shower of Stars ===
In 1945–1946, CBS presented "an extension series" of the original program. In addition to new talent, it featured performances by winners on the original program who had achieved some additional success.

== Tour ==
Major Bowes Amateur Hour also toured the US under the name Major Bowes Jamboree in 1938. The following performers appeared on the stage of Shea's Buffalo:

"It is composed of 12 prize winning acts which have never before appeared in Buffalo, with Ted Mack, former conductor of Shea's Buffalo Orchestra, returning in the role of master of ceremonies. On the screen will be Mickey Rooney, the delightful star of the Judge Hardy family series, in his newest role, Hold That Kiss with Maureen O'Sullivan and Dennis O'Keefe, Shea's Buffalo News will conclude the bill."

"In the stage show, Major Bowes has booked some of the outstanding acts heard over his weekly radio program, most of which have just won honors within the past weeks. Among these are the Three Chords who startled the studio audience and radio listeners with their uncanny imitations of musical instruments and favorite bands, on the May 12 broadcast."

"Bobby Blakeman, choir boy, who is called the Bobby Breen of the Major's hour, brings an unparalleled sweet voice to the program. Louise Boyd, the amateur Eleanor Powell, has a reputation for never missing a tap in her difficult routine; and the Wallace Brothers, (Note: The Wallace brothers – (i) Norman Wallace (né Norman Albert Wallace; 1919–2008) and (ii) Scott Wallace (né Andrew Scott Wallace; 1923–1998)) two fast stepping youngsters from Harlem, will dance their way into the audience's heart." A very young 10 year old named Tommy DeVito would appear in 1938 to sing and play guitar to "Red River Valley, and would later rise to fame as the founder and lead guitarist of the Four Seasons rock/pop band famous in the 1960s, and whose life was portrayed in the Broadway musical "Jersey Boys" and the film of the same name.

"Other entertainers include Ding, Dong and Dell, harmony trio; Harvey Mearns, Swiss bell ringer; Dick King, Imitator; Neva Ames, xylophone wonder; Duane Sister, acrobatic dancer, Adolph Robinson, song and danceman and Gae Allen, toe tapper on drums."

== Ted Mack era ==
Major Bowes Amateur Hour
- Advertisement for The Original Amateur Hour, with Ted Mack
- Created by: Major Bowes
- Based on: Major Bowes and His Original Amateur Hour
- Starring: Ted Mack
- Country of origin: United States

Original release
- Network: DuMont Television Network
- Release: January 18, 1948 – September 25, 1949
- Network: NBC
- Release: October 4, 1949 – September 11, 1954
- Network: ABC
- Release: October 30, 1955 – June 23, 1957
- Network: CBS
- Release: May 1 – October 9, 1959
- Network: ABC
- Release: March 7 – September 26, 1960
- Network: CBS
- Release: October 2, 1960 – September 27, 1970

Ted Mack, who joined the Bowes operation in 1935, was "first assistant in the talent selection, production and direction" for Bowes, became the interim host of the radio show following Bowes' death and a few months later moved it to the fledgling medium of television. It was intermittently broadcast on the DuMont Television Network during 1947 and began regular weekly programs January 18, 1948, still using Bowes' name in the title, Major Bowes' Original Amateur Hour. The TV show subsequently moved to each of the four commercial networks, eventually ending up on its original network, CBS, where the radio show continued to run until 1952. (Another source says that Mack's program ran on ABC radio, rather than on CBS.)

Starting with the 1950–51 season, both the radio and television versions became simply Original Amateur Hour and in 1955, the TV version was renamed Ted Mack and The Original Amateur Hour. Future stars who appeared on the show included Pat Boone and Gladys Knight.

Each episode usually featured eight acts. Viewers selected the winner, casting votes for their favorites by telephone or by mail. Each segment's winner was announced the next week. All contestants who won for three consecutive weeks appeared in an annual championship episode.

Mack's style was decidedly more charitable than that of Bowes. The Major made a strong impression on a young Alan King, who had appeared on the Bowes program as a teen. He was discussing Bowes with Johnny Carson once, and suddenly stomped on the floor and yelled, "Can you hear me down there, Major Bowes?" suggesting that the late radio host had been consigned to Hell as punishment for his treatment of young performers.

In his comic monologue on his album Sinatra at the Sands (1966), Frank Sinatra describes how his vocal group The Hoboken Four's appearances were so popular on Major Bowes Amateur Hour in the mid-1930s that they were brought back week after week, under a different name each time.

== 1992 version ==
On January 26, 1992, the Family Channel launched its version of the program, The New Original Amateur Hour, with Willard Scott as host.
