= Alex Rogers (songwriter) =

American songwriter (1876–1930)

- Born: September 4, 1876; Nashville, Tennessee, U. S.
- Died: September 14, 1930 (aged 54); New York City, New York, U.S.
- Occupation: Composer; songwriter

Alexander Claude Rogers (September 4, 1876 – September 14, 1930), known as Alex Rogers, was a composer and lyricist. He wrote music including for the musical Bandanna Land and served as president and a board member of the Gotham-Attucks Music Publishing Company. The firm published some of his songs.

Rogers was born September 4, 1876 in Nashville, Tennessee. When he was 18, he moved to Philadelphia after joining a minstrel show then in 1902 met Bert Williams and George Walker. The three produced several successful shows the first being In Dahomey which they performed across the United States and England. Other shows with Williams and Walker included Bandanna Land and Abyssinia. Rogers specialized in writing in African American dialects.

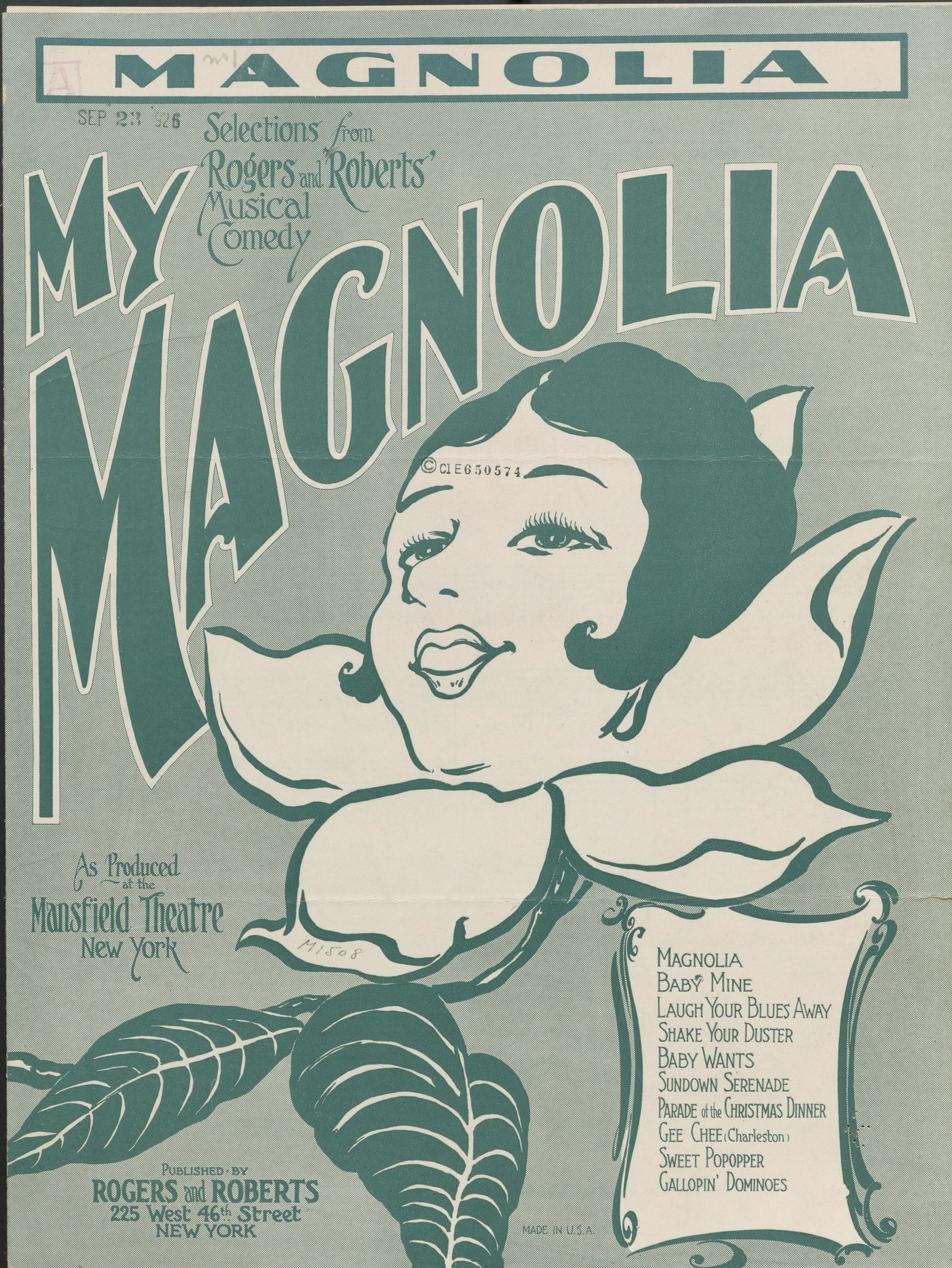
Sheet music cover for the musical My Magnolia with lyrics by Alex C. Rogers and music by C. Luckey Roberts) published by Rogers & Roberts in 1926

After Williams died in 1922, Rogers wrote three Broadway musicals with Luckey Roberts: Go-Go (1923), Sharlee (1923), and My Magnolia (1926), the latter starring Adelaide Hall. He also made several recordings on Victor Records with Eddie Hunter.

Rogers died in September 14, 1930. His obituary ran on the first page of the New York Age and credited him with writing the lyrics to 2,000 songs.

== Songs ==
- "Nobody" (1905) with Bert Williams
- "I May Be Crazy But I Ain't No Fool" (1904)
- "Let It Alone" (1906)
- "I'm a Jonah Man", words and music, published by Williams and Walker Co.
- "Believe Me!" (1910), lyrics
- "Why Adam Sinned"
- "Bon Bon Buddy (The Chocolate Drop)"

== Shows ==
- In Dahomey
- Bandanna Land
- Abyssinia
- Go-Go (1923)
- Sharlee (1923)
- My Magnolia (1926)

== See also ==
- The Frogs (club)
