= Bon Bon Buddy =

1907 song with lyrics by Alex Rogers and music by Will Marion Cook

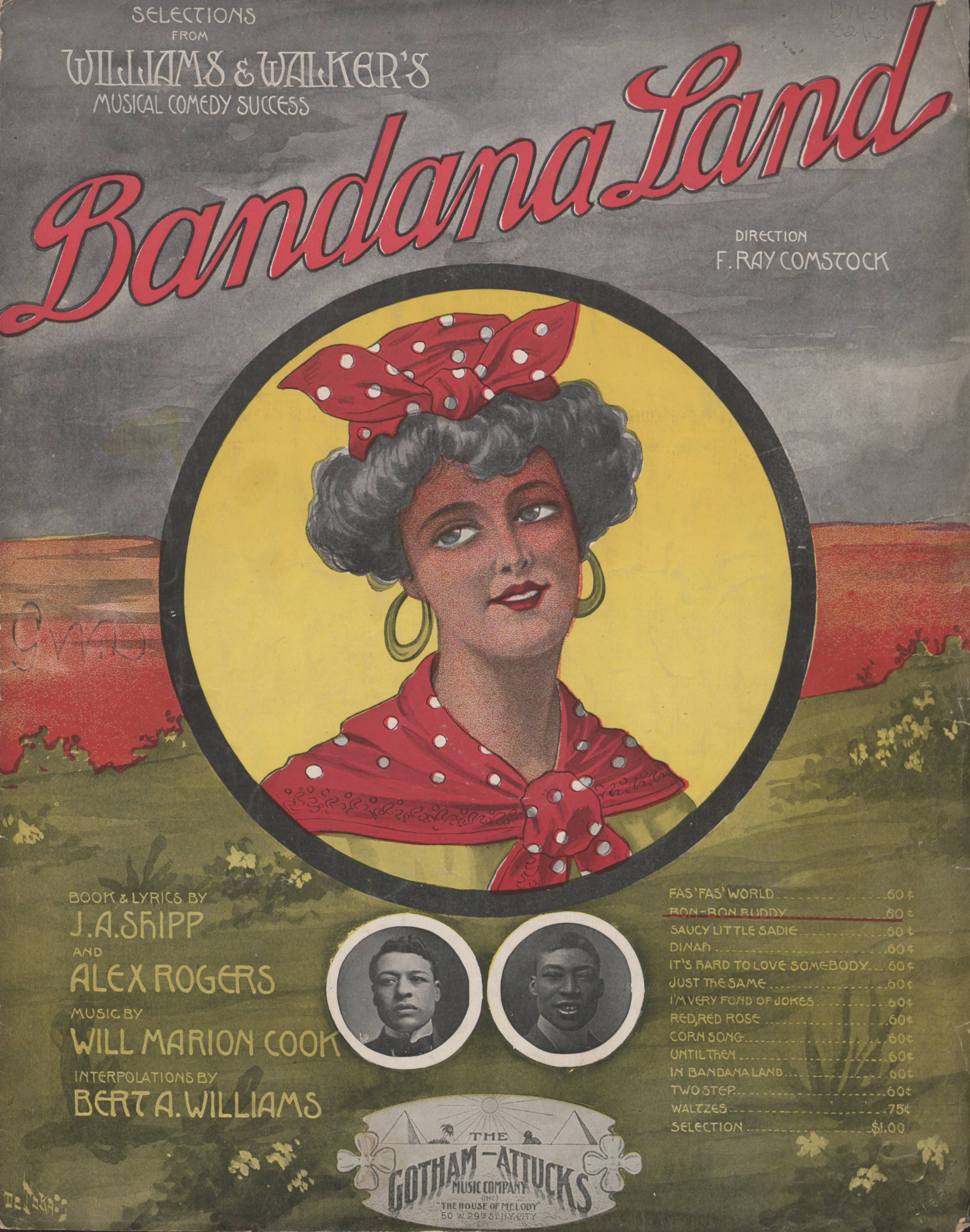
Cover of the song "Bon Bon Buddy" that closed Act 2 of the 1908 musical "Bandanna Land". Bert Williams is in the photo on the lower left; George Walker on the lower right

Bon Bon Buddy (The Chocolate Drop) is a popular song, first published in 1907, with lyrics by Alex Rogers and music by Will Marion Cook. It was introduced in the 1908 musical Bandanna Land. Today the best-known versions of the largely forgotten song are by Billy Murray, who recorded versions in 1908 on both Victor Records and Indestructible Records.

== See also ==
- 1907 in music
- 1908 in music
