= Colburn (surname) =

Colburn is a surname. Notable people with the surname include:

- Albert T. Colburn (1816–?), American politician
- Ben Colburn (born 1982), British philosopher
- Bobby Colburn (1911–2001), American basketball player
- Carrie W. Colburn (c. 1859–1932), American silent film actress
- David R. Colburn (1942–2019), American historian
- Elanor Colburn (1866–1939), American painter
- Elliot Colburn (born 1992), British politician
- Harold L. Colburn Jr. (1925–2012), American physician and politician
- Henry Colburn (1780s–1855), British publisher
- Irving Wightman Colburn (1861–1917), American manufacturer
- Jeremiah Colburn (1815–1891), numismatist and antiquarian
- Jesse Colburn (born 1981), Canadian guitarist
- John F. Colburn (1859–1920), Hawaiian politician
- Lawrence Colburn (1949–2016), US soldier, interventionist in the My Lai Massacre
- Martha Colburn (born 1972), American filmmaker
- Matt Colburn (born 1997), American football player
- Michael J. Colburn (born 1964), American band director
- Nadia Colburn (born 1972), American poet
- Nathaniel Colburn (1611–1691), English settler
- Reuben Colburn (1740–1818), American shipbuilder
- Richard Colburn (born 1970), Scottish musician
- Richard F. Colburn (1950–2024), American politician
- Ryan Colburn (born 1986), American football player
- Samuel Bolton Colburn (1909–1993), American artist
- Serenus Colburn (1871–1927), American architect
- Waldo Colburn (1824–1885), American lawyer and politician
- Warren Colburn (1793–1833), educator
- Zerah Colburn (engineer and writer) (1832–1870)
- Zerah Colburn (mental calculator) (1804–1839)
