= Native Americans in vaudeville =

Native Americans participated in Wild West shows and vaudeville performances during the late 19th and early 20th centuries, often portraying roles that conformed to prevalent stereotypes. Notable Native American vaudeville performers included Molly Spotted Elk, Will Rogers, Esther Louise Georgette Deer, and Lucy Nicolar Poolaw.

== Reasons for involvement ==
Native Americans became involved in vaudeville performances for a variety of reasons and in different ways. The historical context of the 1880s to 1920s, marked by the mistreatment of Native Americans, played a significant role in this involvement. The passage of the Dawes Act in 1887 led to the breakup of reservations, which were divided into allotments for individual Native Americans or families. This effort by the federal government aimed to encourage assimilation among Indigenous populations. Additionally, the government did not offer incentives for Indigenous people to stay on reservations, and the lack of job opportunities made life there difficult. Many Native Americans, facing limited prospects, sought ways to leave the reservations. As they were increasingly driven off their lands or confined to smaller areas, Indigenous people needed to find new ways to survive in a world that was rapidly changing. Vaudeville, with its growing popularity, provided some degree of security.

Life among white Americans was vastly different from that of traditional Indigenous tribes. As their land was taken from them, Native Americans also lost their means of livelihood. The Dawes Act encouraged Native Americans to take up agriculture as a way to assimilate into white culture. However, farming was not a traditional means of survival for many Indigenous people. Native American tribes historically functioned as interdependent communities, relying on each other rather than living as individuals. Native Americans often worked seasonal jobs, such as in lumbering or on river drives, and turned to other forms of work depending on the season. Some turned to vaudeville as a way to earn money, even though wages were typically low. The intrigue surrounding Indigenous culture and its "exotic" appeal made these performances a draw for audiences, and people were willing to pay to see performances by authentic Native Americans.

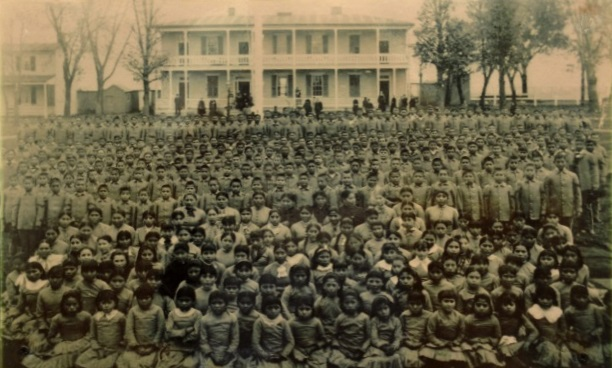
The Carlisle Indian School

During this period, American Indian boarding schools were also prevalent. These schools were another attempt by the U.S. government to assimilate Native Americans into a Eurocentric, Christian lifestyle. Students were punished for speaking their native languages, forced to cut their hair, and made to abandon traditional clothing. They were taught Christianity and instructed to reject their own religions and cultures, which were often portrayed as inferior to white culture. Some of these students ran away to join vaudeville or became performers after graduating. By joining vaudeville, they could embrace their culture and traditions once again, free from the punishment they had endured at the boarding schools. Many students from the Carlisle Indian School reported in surveys that they went on to become vaudeville performers.

The drive to participate in vaudeville was not solely born of necessity. Some, like Will Rogers, joined vaudeville and other forms of performance out of a love for theatrics rather than financial need.

== Stereotypical portrayals ==
Audiences watching vaudeville performances were often not interested in seeing accurate portrayals of Indigenous life in the United States. Instead, they sought entertainment that would affirm their racist assumptions about Native Americans. On stage, Native Americans frequently played into these stereotypes, portraying themselves as primitive and savage through face paint, feather headdresses, and war chants, or "playing Indian" for their white audiences. When Indian dances were performed, it did not matter if a performer from one tribe danced a traditional dance from another tribe. Traditions and cultures often intermixed on vaudeville stages. One Indigenous performer even referred to herself as "the universal Indian," as she would portray a character from whichever tribe the show required. For female Indigenous performers, or non-Indigenous performers playing Indigenous characters, the portrayals were often sexualized and exoticized, sometimes involving revealing costumes paired with feather headdresses.

Wild West shows, the predecessors to vaudeville and other stage performances, laid the groundwork for how Native Americans were portrayed on stage. These shows focused on reenacting stereotypical Western life, especially battles between Native Americans and white cowboys. Native Americans in these shows were depicted as savages opposing the white man, with their war chants often highlighted. Many Native Americans who later performed in vaudeville got their start in these Wild West shows, where they learned to play the role of the "savage Indian."

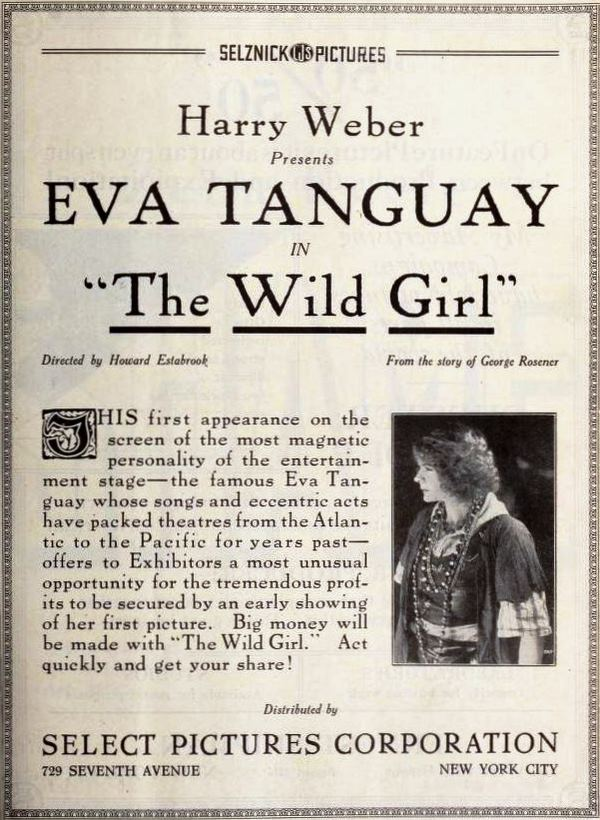
Article written about Eva Tanguay

It was not uncommon for non-Native individuals to portray Native characters by dressing in feathers, war paint, or even painting their skin with a red hue, a practice known as "redface," similar to the use of blackface in minstrel shows. Redface was used in vaudeville to perpetuate the stereotypes of Native Americans as primitive and savage. Eva Tanguay, a vaudeville performer, exemplified this. She portrayed primitive, hyper-sexualized characters dressed in revealing animal skin costumes adorned with feathers. These characters reinforced the exotic, sexualized maiden stereotype associated with Native American women.

Later in the vaudeville period, Indigenous performers, especially those who had gained more fame, had greater control over how they were portrayed on stage. The relationship between Indigenous performers and their audience was more genuine than in other forms of media at the time, which allowed performers to have more creative freedom in their portrayals. This shift enabled Indigenous performers to reclaim some of the power over how their cultures and traditions were represented, challenging the stereotypes of primitivism and savagery that were common in Wild West shows and films of the era. Through this process, performers were able to present their cultures in a more positive light.

== Notable performers ==
=== Molly Spotted Elk ===
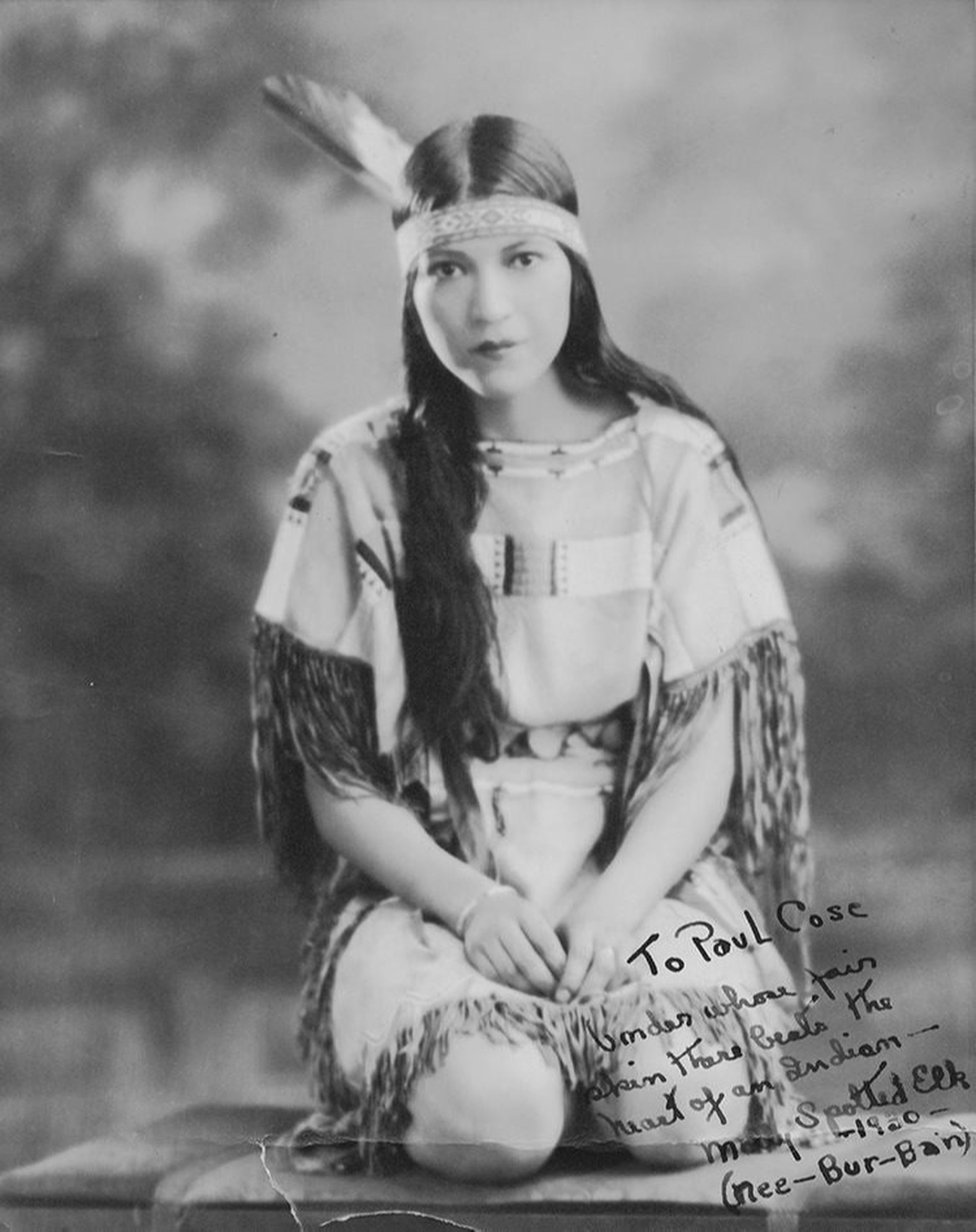
Molly Alice Nelson, also known as Princess Spotted Elk

Molly Alice Nelson, also known as Princess Spotted Elk, was born in Indian Island, Maine, to a Penobscot family. From a young age, Molly had a passion for dance and performed for tourists during the summer alongside other Penobscot children. She often participated in traveling circuses and road shows that passed through her town. After dropping out of high school, Molly joined the traveling vaudeville circuit. However, during this time, she was mistreated by her manager, prompting her to leave and pursue a college education at the University of Pennsylvania. At the university, Molly joined the Women's Glee Club and performed traditional Penobscot dances and songs, accompanied by lectures explaining her cultural traditions.

Eventually, Molly left the academic scene and joined Wild West shows in San Antonio, Texas, which were more focused on perpetuating stereotypes. While performing in a chorus line, Molly gained recognition and soon began performing solo "Indian" dances, often steeped in clichés. She later traveled to New York to perform on vaudeville stages, where she was offered the opportunity to star in a silent film.

During this period, Molly struggled with feeling torn between two worlds. As an Indigenous woman, she was celebrated and accepted by the white people around her, but she was acutely aware that other Native Americans were not afforded the same treatment. While her time in vaudeville provided a means of financial support, both for herself and for her family on the Penobscot reservation, Molly found the revealing, inauthentic costumes she wore on stage to be embarrassing and degrading. Over time, she grew frustrated with the emphasis on her sexual appeal rather than her talent. Eventually, she became disillusioned with the sexualization and stereotyping of her culture in vaudeville performances.

=== Will Rogers ===
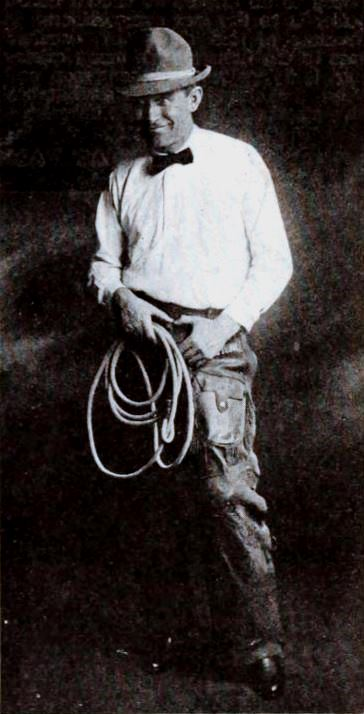
Trick roping master, Will Rogers

Will Rogers, born William Penn Adair Rogers in Indian Territory, Oklahoma, to a Cherokee family, became one of the most well-known vaudeville performers and movie stars of his time. As a young boy, Will was passionate about all things cowboy and had little interest in formal education, suggesting that his future lay outside the classroom. His first form of performance involved doing Indian stomp dances at Saturday night exhibitions with a childhood friend. They would wear the face paint of Plains Indians, headbands, and perform war chants, effectively "playing Indian." During this time, Will also honed his roping skills and became proficient in trick roping.

Rogers eventually joined Texas Jack's Wild West Show on a tour of South Africa, where he was given the nickname "The Cherokee Kid." This marked the first time he performed his trick roping skills for an audience, and he quickly fell in love with the spotlight. After developing a strong bond with the show's organizer, Texas Jack, Will recognized the potential for show business to become his career rather than just a side gig for extra money. After returning to the United States, Will joined the Mulhall Congress of Rough Riders and Ropers, his first major performing role in the country. In this show, Will alternated between playing the cowboy and playing the "Indian" in certain performances.

When Will transitioned to vaudeville, he introduced a trick roping act where he would rope both a horse and rider on the small vaudeville stage. His roping talents, along with the comedic commentary that accompanied his acts, soon made him famous. Although Rogers did not typically focus on showcasing his Indigenous heritage in his vaudeville performances, he often emphasized his cowboy and ranching background. Later in his career, he went on to star in Western films.

=== Esther Louise Georgette Deer (Princess White Deer) ===
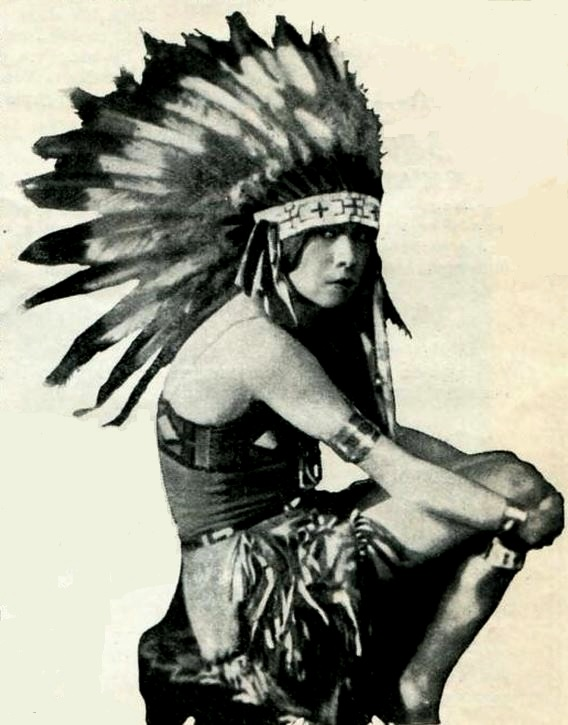
Esther Louise Georgette Deer- Princess White Deer

Esther Louise Georgette Deer, known by her stage name Princess White Deer, began her performing career at an early age. Born into a family of performers, she toured various countries with them. Eventually, Princess White Deer moved to the United States and started her solo career on the vaudeville stage.

Recognized as the most accomplished Mohawk entertainer of her time, she collaborated with other renowned performers, appeared on Broadway, and formed her own ensemble. Princess White Deer also wrote and starred in her own play, From Wigwam to White Lights. This production celebrated the significant contributions of Native Americans to art, music, dance, and theater, reflecting Princess White Deer's blend of cultural heritage with the image of a modern professional woman.

=== Lucy Nicolar Poolaw (Princess Watahwaso) ===
Lucy Nicolar Poolaw, known by her stage name Princess Watahwaso, was a renowned Native American performer who graced the American circuit. She performed in vaudeville shows, where she would sing and dance. While traveling, Lucy united talents from diverse tribal backgrounds, including Penobscot, Kiowa, Cherokee, and Mohawk.

During her travels, she met Bruce Poolaw of the Kiowa Nation, whom she later married. Together, they formed a dynamic duo, portraying Native Americans in various productions. One of their notable performances was in The Courtship of Rippling Water, in which Princess Watahwaso and Bruce Poolaw, as Young Chief Poolaw, captivated audiences. After retiring from performing, the couple returned to the Penobscot reservation on Indian Island, Maine, marking the end of their stage careers.
