= Colburn School (Lowell, Massachusetts) =

- U.S. National Register of Historic Places
- U.S. Historic district – Contributing property
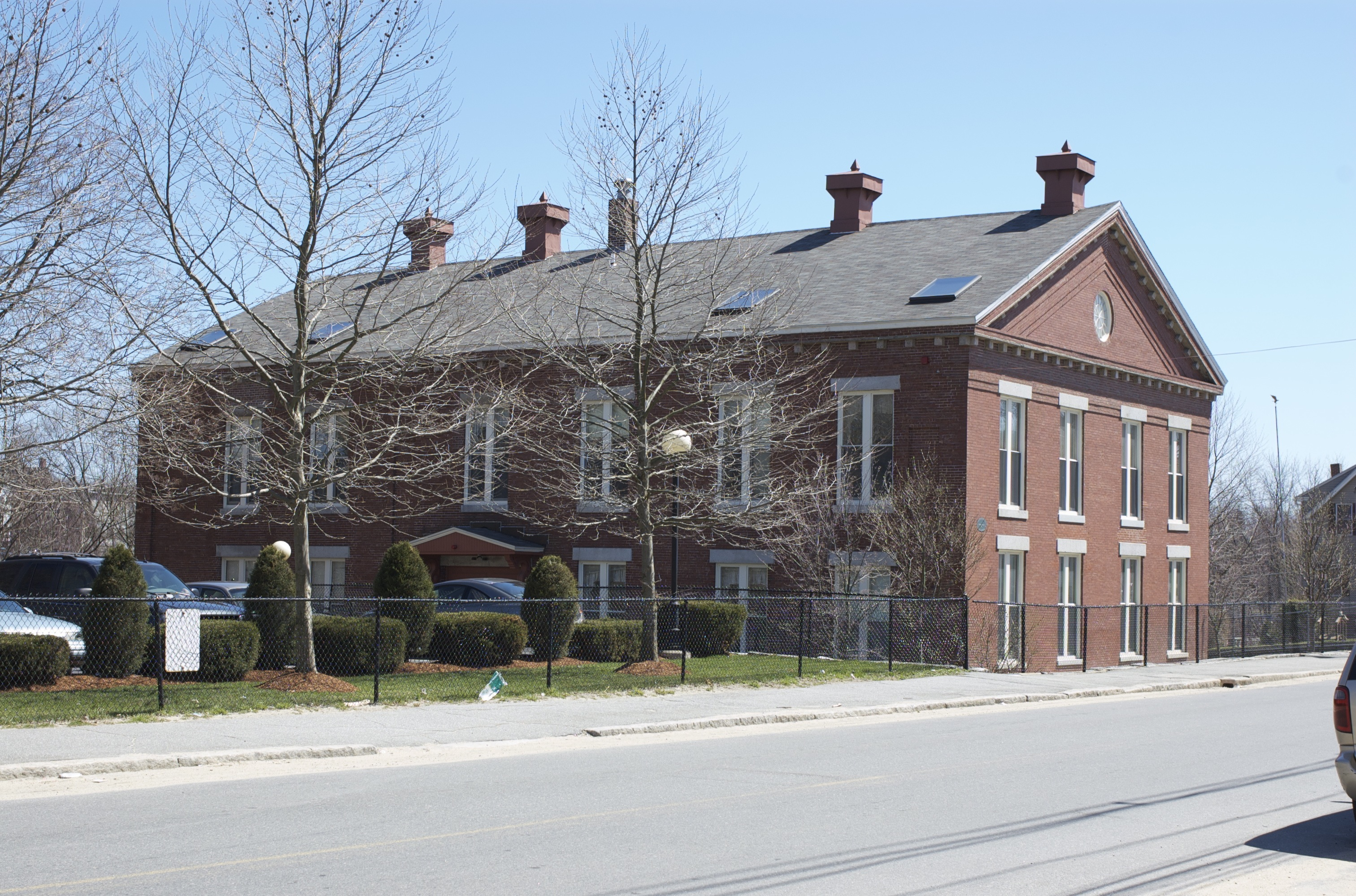

- Location within Massachusetts Location within the United States
- Location: Lowell, Massachusetts
- Coordinates: 42°38′23″N 71°18′16″W
- Built: 1848
- Architect: Graves, Jacob
- Architectural style: Greek Revival
- Part of: Lowell National Historical Park (ID78003149)
- NRHP reference No.: 94001592

Significant dates
- Added to NRHP: May 19, 1995
- Designated CP: June 5, 1978

The Colburn School is a historic former school building at 136 Lawrence Street in Lowell, Massachusetts, USA. Built in 1848, it is a fine example of institutional Greek Revival architecture, and is one of the city's older surviving school buildings, built during the rapid population growth that followed the city's industrialization. Now converted to apartments, it was listed on the National Register of Historic Places in 1995.

== Description and history ==
The Colburn School is located on the east side of Lawrence Street, between it and the Concord River, in a densely-built residential area south of Lowell's downtown and industrial area. It is a large two story brick structure, rectangular in footprint, with a gable roof with the end facing the street. The gable end is fully pedimented, with modillions in the gable and main cornice. Windows are uniformly spaced, with simple granite sills and lintels. The buildings main entrances were historically on the north and south facades; they are sheltered by late 19th-century porticos, and the northern one is now the primary access.

The city of Lowell was incorporated in 1826, originally part of Chelmsford, and was rapidly industrialized, with construction of mills and industrial infrastructure begun in 1822. In the following decades the population grew rapidly, and the city built schools in the neighborhoods to serve the population. The Colburn School was built in 1848, named for Warren Colburn, a superintendent of the Merrimack Manufacturing Company, and originally provided single classrooms for grades 1-3 on the ground floor, and 4-8 on the upper floor. In 1863 it was converted to a fully graded school, and its interior was reconfigured to house eight classrooms. In the 1890s it was also used as a teacher training facility. Lowell's school population began to decline in the 1920s, but the Colburn School remained in use as an elementary school until it was closed in 1992. The building has since been converted to apartments.

== See also ==
- National Register of Historic Places listings in Lowell, Massachusetts
