= Vaudeville =

Entertainment genre

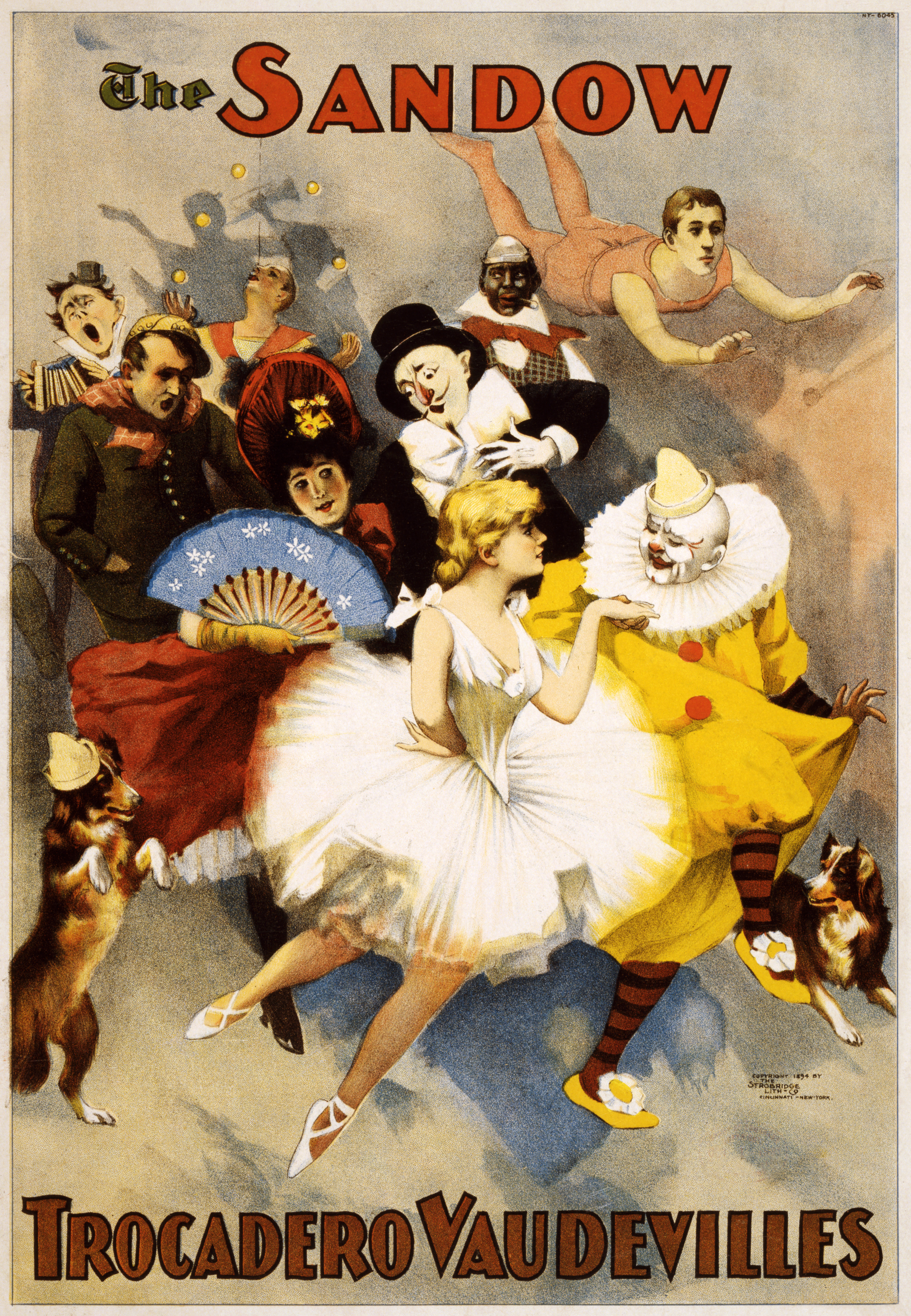
A promotional poster for the Sandow Trocadero Vaudevilles (1894), showing dancers, clowns, trapeze artists, costumed dogs, singers and costumed actors

Vaudeville (/ˈvɔːd(ə)vɪl, ˈvoʊ-/; French: [vodvil]) is a theatrical genre of variety entertainment which became popular in the United States and Canada from the early 1870s until the early 1930s.

In some ways analogous to the music hall of Victorian-era Britain, a typical North American vaudeville performance was made up of a series of separate, unrelated acts grouped together on a common bill. Types of acts included popular and classical musicians, singers, dancers, comedians, trained animals, magicians, ventriloquists, strongmen, female and male impersonators, acrobats, clowns, mimes, illustrated songs, jugglers, athletes, minstrel shows, lecturing celebrities, or performances of scenes from plays, one-act plays, and films. A vaudeville performer is often referred to as a vaudevillian.

Vaudeville developed from many sources, including the concert saloon, minstrelsy, freak shows, dime museums, and literary American burlesque. Called "the heart of American show business", vaudeville was one of the most popular types of entertainment in the Americas, Australia, and Europe for several decades.

While the French word vaudeville remains associated with variety entertainment in the English-speaking world, in France it now refers exclusively to a genre of theatrical farce—sometimes specifically bedroom farces—not necessarily involving music.

== Etymology ==
The origin of the term has yet to be determined, but it is often said to be derived from the French expression voix de ville 'voice of the city'. A second hypothesis is that it comes from the 15th-century songs on satire by poet Olivier Basselin, "Vau de Vire". In his Connections television series, science historian James Burke argues that the term is a corruption of the French Vau de Vire 'Vire River Valley', an area known for its bawdy drinking songs and where Basselin lived. In 1949, when vaudeville returned to New York's Palace Theatre after many years' absence, the New York Times wrote: "Derived from Val De Vire (Valley of the Vire), a sector in Normandy where sprightly drinking songs originated." The Oxford English Dictionary also endorses the vau de vire origin, a truncated form of chanson du Vau de Vire 'song of the Valley of the Vire'. Around 1610, Jean le Houx collected these works as Le Livre des Chants nouveaux de Vaudevire, which is probably the direct origin of the word.

== Beginnings ==
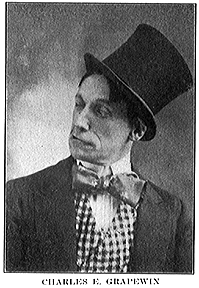
From newspaper promotional for vaudeville character actor Charles Grapewin, c. 1900

The Anglo-Saxon vaudeville derives its name from the French genre of entertainment known as comédie en vaudevilles, which developed from the late 17th century and combined acting with musical performances. With its first subtle appearances in the early 1860s, vaudeville was not initially a common form of entertainment in the United States. The form gradually evolved from the concert saloon and variety hall into its mature form throughout the 1870s and 1880s. This more genteel form was known as "Polite Vaudeville".

In the years before the American Civil War, entertainment existed on a different scale. Similar variety theatre existed before 1860 in Europe and elsewhere. In the US, as early as the first decades of the 19th century, theatergoers could enjoy a performance consisting of Shakespeare plays, acrobatics, singing, dancing, and comedy. As the years progressed, people seeking diversified amusement found an increasing number of ways to be entertained. Vaudeville was characterized by traveling companies touring through cities and towns. A handful of circuses regularly toured the country; dime museums appealed to the curious; amusement parks, riverboats, and town halls often featured "cleaner" presentations of variety entertainment; compared to saloons, music halls, and burlesque houses, which catered to those with a taste for the risqué. In the 1840s, the minstrel show, another type of variety performance, and "the first emanation of a pervasive and purely American mass culture", grew to enormous popularity and formed what Nick Tosches called "the heart of 19th-century show business". A significant influence also came from "Dutch" (i, German or faux-German) minstrels and comedians. Medicine shows traveled the countryside offering programs of comedy, music, jugglers, and other novelties along with displays of tonics, salves, and miracle elixirs, while "Wild West" shows provided romantic vistas of the disappearing frontier, complete with trick riding, music and drama. Vaudeville incorporated these various itinerant amusements into a stable, institutionalized form centered in America's growing urban hubs.

From the mid-1860s, impresario Tony Pastor, a former singing circus clown who had become a prominent variety theater performer and manager, capitalized on middle class sensibilities and spending power when he began to feature "polite" variety programs in his New York City theatres. Pastor opened his first "Opera House" on the Bowery in 1865, later moving his variety theater operation to Broadway and, finally, to Fourteenth Street near Union Square. He only began to use the term "vaudeville" in place of "variety" in early 1876. Hoping to draw a potential audience from female and family-based shopping traffic uptown, Pastor barred the sale of liquor in his theatres, eliminated bawdy material from his shows, and offered gifts of coal and hams to attendees. Pastor's experiment proved successful, and other managers soon followed suit.

== Popularity ==
Performance bill for Temple Theatre, Detroit, 1 December 1902

The manager's comments, sent back to the circuit's central office weekly, follow each act's description. The bill illustrates the typical pattern of opening the show with a "dumb" act to allow patrons to find their seats, placing strong acts in second and penultimate positions, and leaving the weakest act for the end, to clear the house.

In this bill, as in many vaudeville shows, acts often associated with "lowbrow" or popular entertainment (acrobats, a trained mule) shared a stage with acts more usually regarded as "highbrow" or classical entertainment (opera vocalists, classical musicians).

- (1) Burt Jordan and Rosa Crouch. "Sensational, grotesque and 'buck' dancers. A good act ..."
- (2) The White Tscherkess Trio. "A man and two women who do a singing turn of the operatic order. They carry special scenery which is very artistic and their costumes are original and neat. Their voices are good and blend exceedingly well. The act goes big with the audience."
- (3) Sarah Midgely and Gertie Carlisle. "Presenting the sketch 'After School.' ... they are a 'knockout.'"
- (4) Theodor F. Smith and Jenny St. George-Fuller. "Refined instrumentalists."
- (5) Milly Capell. "European equestrienne. This is her second week. On account of the very pretty picture that she makes she goes as strong as she did last week."
- (6) R. J. Jose. "Tenor singer. The very best of them all."
- (7) The Nelson Family of Acrobats. "This act is composed of three men, two young women, three boys and two small girls. The greatest acrobatic act extant."
- (8) James Thornton. "Monologist and vocalist. He goes like a cyclone. It is a case of continuous laughter from his entrance to his exit."
- (9) Burk and Andrus and Their Trained Mule. "This act, if it can be so classed, was closed after the evening performance."

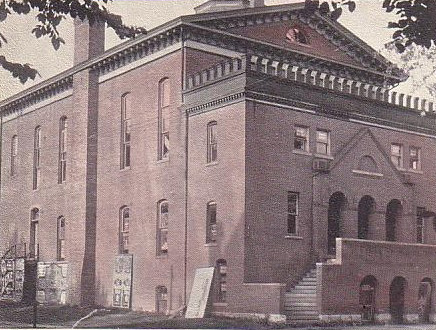

"The Opera" in Kirksville, Missouri was on the Vaudeville circuit. Vaudeville played in both large and small venues in cities and towns.

B. F. Keith took the next step, starting in Boston, where he built an empire of theatres and brought vaudeville to the United States and Canada. Later, E. F. Albee, adoptive grandfather of the Pulitzer Prize-winning playwright Edward Albee, managed the chain to its greatest success. Circuits such as those managed by Keith-Albee provided vaudeville's greatest economic innovation and the principal source of its industrial strength. They enabled a chain of allied vaudeville houses that remedied the chaos of the single-theatre booking system by contracting acts for regional and national tours. These could easily be lengthened from a few weeks to two years.

Albee also gave national prominence to vaudeville's trumpeting "polite" entertainment, a commitment to entertainment equally inoffensive to men, women and children. Acts that violated this ethos (e.g., those that used words such as "hell") were admonished and threatened with expulsion from the week's remaining performances or were canceled altogether. In spite of such threats, performers routinely flouted this censorship, often to the delight of the very audience members whose sensibilities were supposedly endangered. He eventually instituted a set of guidelines to be an audience member at his show, and these were reinforced by the ushers working in the theatre.

This "polite entertainment" also extended to Keith's company members. He went to extreme measures to maintain this level of modesty. Keith even went as far as posting warnings backstage such as this: "Don't say 'slob' or 'son of a gun' or 'hully gee' on the stage unless you want to be canceled peremptorily... if you are guilty of uttering anything sacrilegious or even suggestive you will be immediately closed and will never again be allowed in a theatre where Mr. Keith is in authority." Along these same lines of discipline, Keith's theatre managers would occasionally send out blue envelopes with orders to omit certain suggestive lines of songs and possible substitutions for those words. If actors chose to ignore these orders or quit, they would get "a black mark" on their name and would never again be allowed to work on the Keith Circuit. Thus, actors learned to follow the instructions given to them by B. F. Keith for fear of losing their careers forever.

By the late 1890s, vaudeville had large circuits, houses (small and large) in almost every sizable location, standardized booking, broad pools of skilled acts, and a loyal national following. One of the biggest circuits was Martin Beck's Orpheum Circuit. It incorporated in 1919 and brought together 45 vaudeville theatres in 36 cities throughout the United States and Canada and a large interest in two vaudeville circuits. Another major circuit was that of Alexander Pantages. In his heyday, Pantages owned more than 30 vaudeville theatres and controlled, through management contracts, perhaps 60 more in both the United States and Canada.

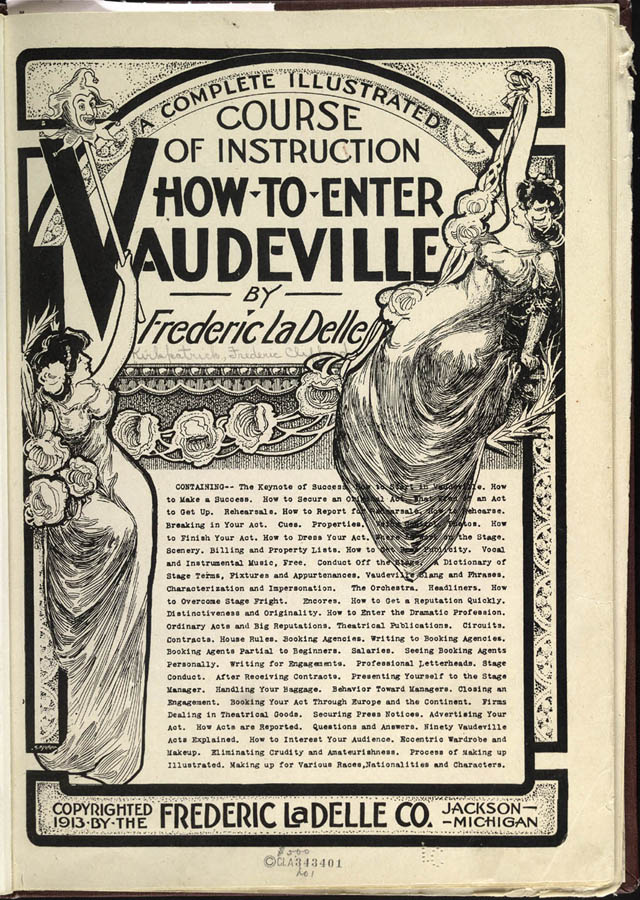
This 1913 how-to booklet for would-be vaudevillians was recently republished.

At its height, vaudeville played across multiple strata of economic class and auditorium size. On the vaudeville circuit, it was said that if an act would succeed in Peoria, Illinois, it would work anywhere. The question "Will it play in Peoria?" has now become a metaphor for whether something appeals to the American mainstream public.

The three most common levels were the "small time" (lower-paying contracts for more frequent performances in rougher, often converted theatres), the "medium time" (moderate wages for two performances each day in purpose-built theatres), and the "big time" (possible remuneration of several thousand dollars per week in large, urban theatres largely patronized by the middle and upper-middle classes). As performers rose in renown and established regional and national followings, they worked their way into the less arduous working conditions and better pay of the big time.

The capital was New York City's Palace Theatre (or just "The Palace" in the slang of vaudevillians), built by Martin Beck in 1913 and operated by Keith. Featuring a bill with novelty acts, national celebrities, and masters of vaudeville performance (such as comedian and trick roper Will Rogers), the Palace provided what many vaudevillians considered the apotheosis of careers.

A standard show bill would begin with a sketch, follow with a single (an individual male or female performer); next would be an alley-oop (an acrobatic act); then another single, followed by yet another sketch such as a blackface comedy. The acts that followed these for the rest of the show would vary from musicals to jugglers to song-and-dance singles and end with a final extravaganza – either musical or drama – with the full company. These shows would feature such stars as ragtime and jazz pianist Eubie Blake, the magician Harry Houdini, and child star Baby Rose Marie.

In the New-York Tribune's article about vaudeville, it is said that at any given time, vaudeville was employing over twelve thousand people throughout its entire industry. Each entertainer would be on the road 42 weeks at a time while working a particular "Circuit" – or an individual theatre chain of a major company.

While the neighborhood character of vaudeville attendance had always promoted a tendency to tailor fare to specific audiences, mature vaudeville grew to feature houses and circuits specifically aimed at certain demographic groups. Black patrons, often segregated into the rear of the second gallery in white-oriented theatres, had their own smaller circuits, as did speakers of Italian and Yiddish (see below). This foreign addition combined with comedy produced such acts as "minstrel shows of antebellum America" and Yiddish theatre. Many ethnic families joined in on this entertainment business, and for them, this traveling lifestyle was simply a continuation of the circumstances that brought them to America. Through these acts, they were able to assimilate themselves into their new home while also bringing bits of their own culture into this new world. White-oriented regional circuits, such as New England's "Peanut Circuit", also provided essential training grounds for new artists while allowing established acts to experiment with and polish new material. At its height, vaudeville was rivaled only by churches and public schools among the nation's premiere public gathering places.

Another slightly different aspect of Vaudeville was an increasing interest in the female figure. The previously mentioned ominous idea of "the blue envelopes" led to the phrase "blue" material, which described the provocative subject matter present in many Vaudeville acts of the time. Many managers even saw this scandalous material as a marketing strategy to attract many different audiences. As stated in Andrew Erdman's book Blue Vaudeville, the Vaudeville stage was "a highly sexualized space ... where unclad bodies, provocative dancers, and singers of 'blue' lyrics all vied for attention." Such performances highlighted and objectified the female body as a "sexual delight", but more than that, historians think that Vaudeville marked a time in which the female body became its own "sexual spectacle". This sexual image began sprouting everywhere an American went: the shops, a restaurant, the grocery store, etc. The more this image brought in the highest revenue, the more Vaudeville focused on acts involving women. Even acts that were as innocent as a sister act were higher sellers than a good brother act. Consequently, Erdman adds that female Vaudeville performers such as Julie Mackey and Gibson's Bathing Girls began to focus less on talent and more on physical appeal through their figure, tight gowns, and other revealing attire. It eventually came as a surprise to audience members when such beautiful women actually possessed talent in addition to their appealing looks. This element of surprise colored much of the reaction to the female entertainment of this time.

== Circuits ==
- B. F. Keith Circuit
- Orpheum Circuit
- Alexander Pantages
- Gus Sun

Burlesque

- Mutual Burlesque Association
- Columbia Amusement Company
- American Burlesque Wheel

== Women ==
In the 1920s, announcements seeking all-girl bands for vaudeville performances appeared in industry publications like Billboard, Variety and in newspapers. Bands like the Ingenues and the Dixie Sweethearts were well-publicized, while other groups were simply described as "all-girl Revue". According to Feminist Theory, similar trends in theater and film objectified women, an example of male gaze, as women's role in public life was expanding. These expectations for women in the 19th century played a big role in the compelling aspects of vaudeville. Through vaudeville, many women were allowed to join their male counterparts on the stage and found success in their acts.

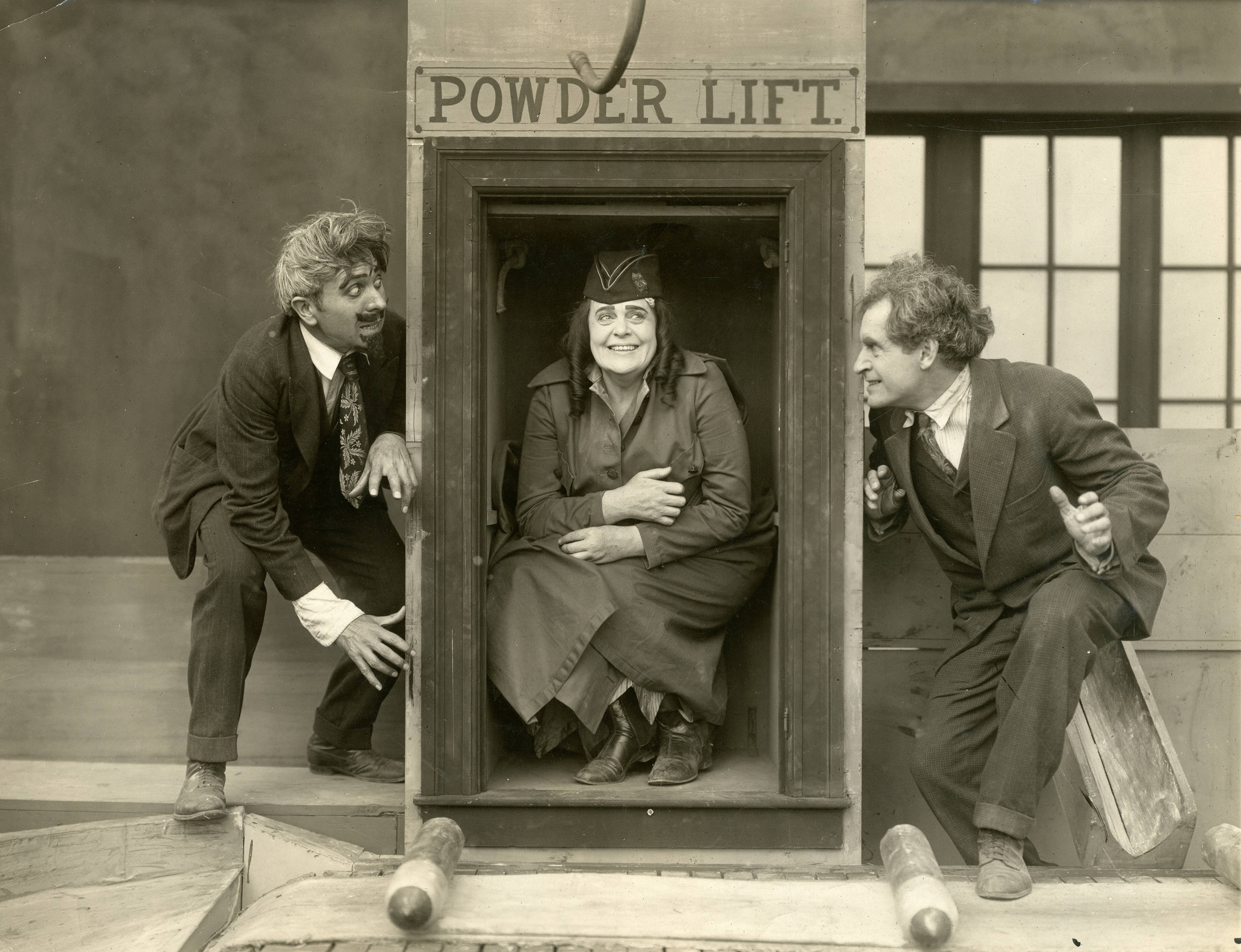
Marie Dressler in "Tillie the Scrub Lady"

Leila Marie Koerber, later Marie Dressler, was a Canadian actress who specialized in vaudeville comedy, and eventually won an Academy Award for Best Actress later in her career. Being the daughter of a musician, she moved to the United States of America in her childhood. At just fourteen years old, she left home to begin her career, lying about her age and sending her mother half of her paycheck. Dressler found great success and was known for her comedic timing and physical comedy, like carrying her male co-stars. She eventually worked on Broadway, where she had a great desire to become a serious actress but was advised to remain in comedy. She went on to star in a few films but again returned to vaudeville, her original career.

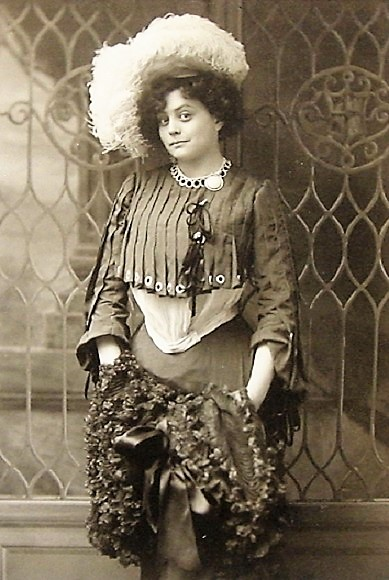
Trixie Friganza Hayes

Another famous vaudevillian actress was Trixie Friganza, born Delia O'Callaghan. She had a famous catchphrase: "You know Trixie with her bag of tricks." She began her career in opera, performing to help provide for her family. The oldest of three daughters, she wanted to help her family financially but had to do it secretly, as female performers were frowned on at the time. She worked largely in comedy and gained acclaim and success due to her willingness to step into other's roles who had fallen ill, and were otherwise unable to perform. In her acts she often emphasized her plus-size figure, calling herself the "perfect forty-six". Friganza was also a poet and writer. She used many of her performances as ways to raise money to support the poor or disenfranchised and went on record publicly numerous times to support these social causes. Friganza spent much of her life fighting for women's equality and pushing for self-acceptance for women, both publicly and within themselves, as well as their rights in comparison to men.

Betty Felsen was an American ballerina, vaudeville star, and teacher. She was born on 9 June 1905, in Chicago, IL Betty began taking lessons at a local Chicago ballet school when she was eight years old, and often performed solo dances in shows presented by that school. Just before her tenth birthday in 1916, her parents enrolled her as a ballet student with the Pavley-Oukrainsky Ballet School within the Chicago Opera Association. Then, in 1919 Betty was accepted to be a member of the Chicago Opera's Pavley-Oukrainsky Ballet corps de ballet. From December 1920 until the fall of 1922, Betty was a ballerina soloist and performed with them throughout North America. Under the name Buddye Felsen, Betty landed a starring dancing role in a new show at Fred Mann's Million Dollar Rainbo Room in the Rainbo Gardens. The show, Rainbo Trail, directed by Frank Westphal, opened on 15 December 1922, and ran until 1 March 1923. In the winter of 1923 Betty began a partnership with Jack Broderick. From then until the end of 1927 Broderick & Felsen performed on the B.F. Keith and Pantages vaudeville circuits throughout the U.S. and Canada. Their act evolved from a simple dance act to one with over twenty dancers, an orchestra, and elaborate costumes and sets. From 1925 to 1926 they played for 20 straight weeks at the Colony Theater on Broadway in New York City. In 1926 and 1927, they starred in two spectacular musical productions, touring across the United States and Canada, first for about three months in Emil Boreo’s Mirage de Paris followed by nine months in their own Ballet Caprice. After Jack quit the act near the end of 1927, Betty continued to manage the troupe and, with a new dance partner, toured throughout the northeastern United States for the next six months as Betty Felsen and Company. The final performance of Ballet Caprice was on 4 June 1928, at Broadway’s Palace Theater in New York City.

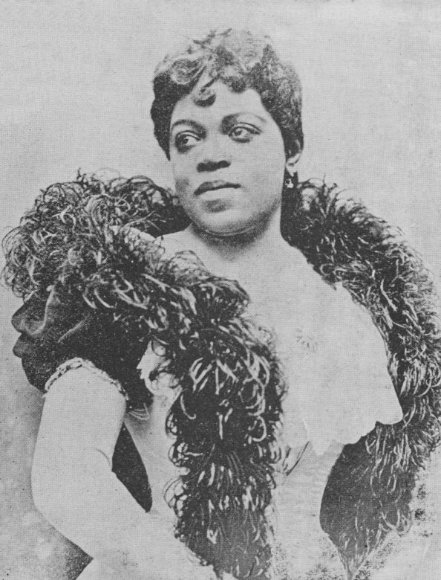
World-renowned opera singer Sissieretta Jones ran her own Vaudeville touring company, Black Patti's Troubadours.

Another famous comedienne, one who brought in thousands of audience members with her signature improvisational skills, was May Irwin. She worked from about 1875 to 1914. Born Ada Campbell, she began her life on the stage at thirteen years old following the death of her father. She and her older sister created a singing act called the "Irwin Sisters". Many years later, their act had taken off and with performances in both vaudeville and burlesque at famous music halls, until Irwin decided to continue her career on her own. She then changed her approach to vaudeville, performing African-American-influenced songs, even later writing her songs. She introduced her signature in vaudeville, "The Bully Song", which was performed in a Broadway show. This is when she began experimenting with improvisational comedy and quickly found her unique success, even taking her performances global with acts in the U.K.

Sophie Tucker, a Russian Jewish immigrant, was told by promoter Chris Brown that she was not attractive enough to succeed in show business without doing Blackface, so she performed that way for the first two years onstage, until one day she decided to go without it, and achieved much greater success being herself from that point on, especially with her song "Some of These Days".

Moms Mabley was a comedienne who got her start in Vaudeville and the Chitlin circuits in the 1920s, and ended up with mainstream success in the 20th century. Other 20th century women performers who started in Vaudeville included blues singers Ma Rainey, Ida Cox and Bessie Smith. Women-led touring companies like Black Patti's Troubadours, the Whitman Sisters and the Hyers Sisters were popular acts. Other women worked the business side of Vaudeville, like Amanda Thorpe, a white woman who founded a black theater in Virginia, and the Griffin Sisters, who managed several theaters in their efforts to create a Black Vaudeville circuit.

== Black Vaudeville ==
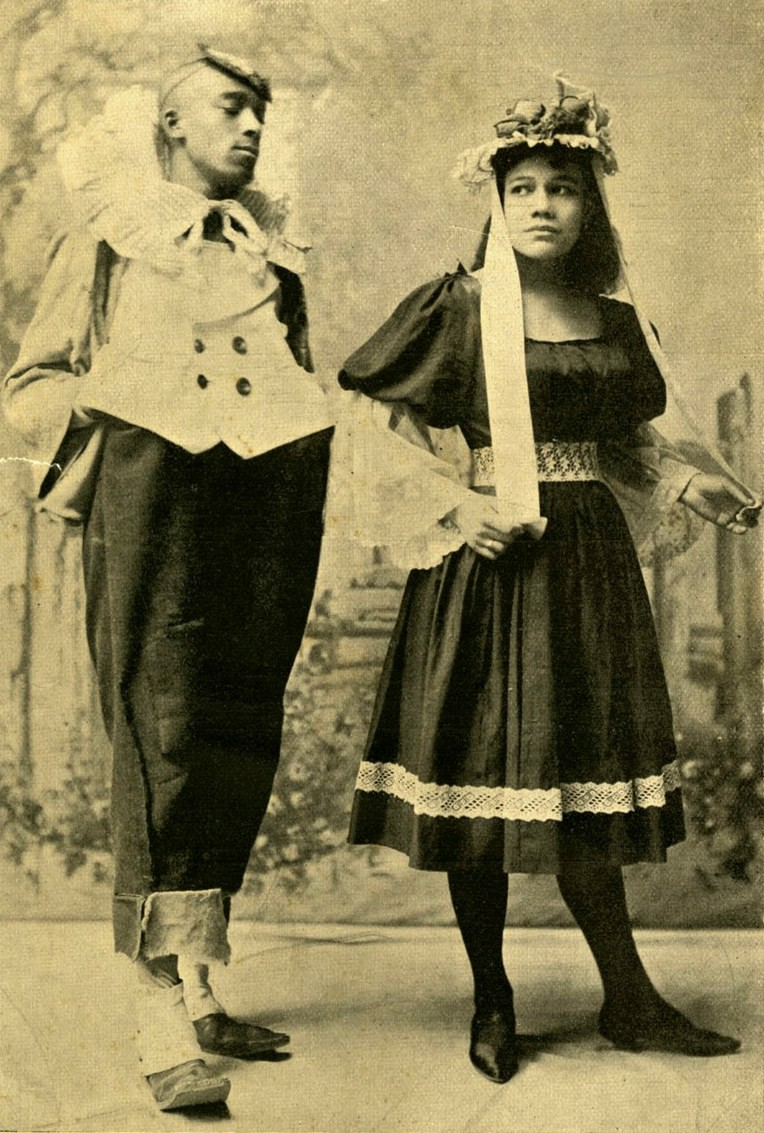
Albert and Mamie Anderson performed as a comedy duo with Sam T. Jack's Creole Show and ran their own touring company, Lady Africa, in the early 1900s.

Black performers and patrons participated in a racially segregated Vaudeville circuit. Though many popular acts like Lewis and Walker, Ernest Hogan, Irving Jones, and the Hyers Sisters played to both white and black audiences, early Vaudeville performances for white audiences were limited to one Black act per show, and performers faced discrimination in restaurants and lodging. Entertainers and entrepreneurs like the Whitman Sisters, Pat Chappelle and John Isham created and managed their own touring companies; others took on theater ownership and management and created Black Vaudeville circuits, as was the case for Sherman H. Dudley and the Griffin Sisters Later, in the 1920s, many bookings were managed by the Theatre Owners Booking Association.

African-Americans challenged the prevailing Blackface stereotypes played by white performers by bringing their own authenticity and style to the stage, composing music, comedy and dance routines and laying the groundwork for distinctly American cultural phenomena like blues, jazz, ragtime and tap dance. Notable Black entertainers in Vaudeville included comedians Bert Williams, and George Walker, dancer/choreographer Ada Overton Walker, and many others. Black songwriters and composers like Bob Cole, Ernest Hogan, Irving Jones, Rosamond Johnson, George Johnson, Tom Lemonier, Gussie L. Davis, and Chris Smith, wrote many of the songs that were popularized onstage by white singers, and paved the way for African-American musical theater.

== Immigrant America ==
In addition to vaudeville's prominence as a form of American entertainment, it reflected the newly evolving urban inner-city culture and interaction of its operators and audience. Making up a large portion of immigration to the United States in the mid-19th century, Irish Americans interacted with established Americans, with the Irish becoming subject to discrimination due to their perceived ethnic, physical, and cultural characteristics. The ethnic stereotypes of Irish through their greenhorn depiction alluded to their newly arrived status as immigrant Americans, with the stereotype portrayed in avenues of entertainment.

Following the Irish immigration wave were several waves in which new immigrants from different backgrounds came in contact with the Irish in America's urban centers. Already settled and being native English speakers, Irish Americans took hold of these advantages and began to assert their positions in the immigrant racial hierarchy based on skin tone and assimilation status, cementing job positions that were previously unavailable to them as recently arrived immigrants. As a result, Irish Americans became prominent in vaudeville entertainment as curators and actors, creating a unique ethnic interplay between Irish American use of self-deprecation as humor and their diverse inner city surroundings.

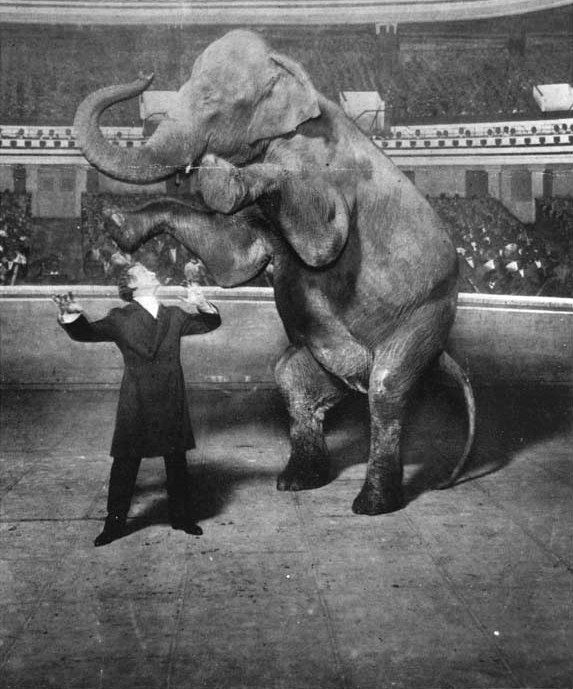
Harry Houdini and Jennie, the Vanishing Elephant, January 7, 1918

The interactions between newly arrived immigrants and settled immigrants within the backdrop of the unknown American urban landscape allowed vaudeville to be utilized as an avenue for expression and understanding. The often hostile immigrant experience in their new country was now used for comic relief on the vaudeville stage, where stereotypes of different ethnic groups were perpetuated. The crude stereotypes that emerged were easily identifiable not only by their distinct ethnic cultural attributes, but how those attributes differed from the mainstream established American culture and identity.

Coupled with their historical presence on the English stage for comic relief, and as operators and actors of the vaudeville stage, Irish Americans became interpreters of immigrant cultural images in American popular culture. New arrivals found their ethnic group status defined within the immigrant population and in their new country as a whole by the Irish on stage. Unfortunately, the same interactions between ethnic groups within the close living conditions of cities also created racial tensions which were reflected in vaudeville. Conflict between Irish and African Americans saw the promotion of black-face minstrelsy on the stage, purposefully used to place African Americans beneath the Irish in the racial and social urban hierarchy.

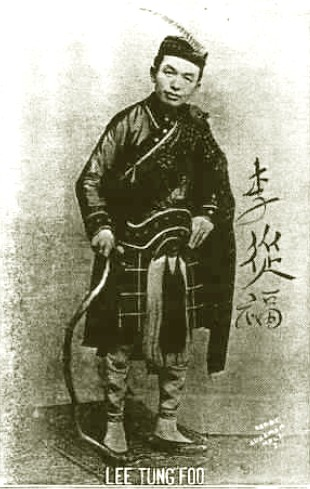
Chinese-American Vaudeville comedian Lee Tung Foo, dressed in a Scottish kilt

Although the Irish had a strong Celtic presence in vaudeville and in the promotion of ethnic stereotypes, the ethnic groups that they were characterizing also utilized the same humor. As the Irish donned their ethnic costumes, groups such as the Chinese, Italians, Germans and Jews utilized ethnic caricatures to understand themselves as well as the Irish. The urban diversity within the vaudeville stage and audience also reflected their societal status, with the working class constituting two-thirds of the typical vaudeville audience.

The ethnic caricatures that now comprised American humor reflected the positive and negative interactions between ethnic groups in America's cities. The caricatures served as a method of understanding different groups and their societal positions within their cities. The use of the greenhorn immigrant for comedic effect showcased how immigrants were viewed as new arrivals, but also what they could aspire to be. In addition to interpreting visual ethnic caricatures, the Irish American ideal of transitioning from the shanty to the lace curtain became a model of economic upward mobility for immigrant groups.

== Decline ==
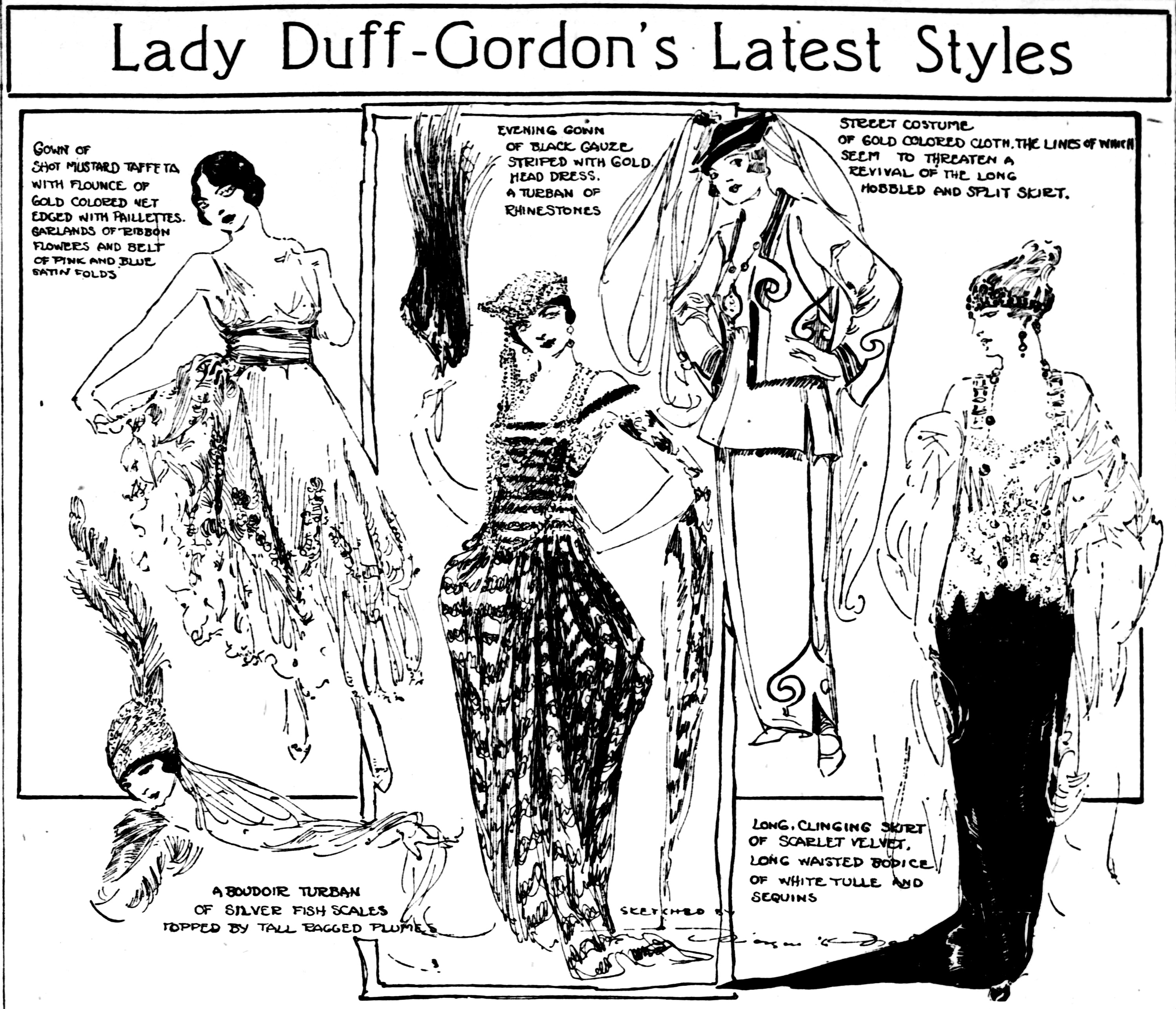
Styles of Lucy, Lady Duff-Gordon, as presented in a vaudeville circuit pantomime and sketched by Marguerite Martyn of the St. Louis Post-Dispatch in April 1918

The decline of vaudeville was primarily driven by the continued growth of the lower-priced cinema in the early 1910s, similar to the advent of free broadcast television's diminishing the cultural and economic strength of the cinema. Cinema was first regularly commercially presented in the US in vaudeville halls. The first public showing of movies projected on a screen took place at Koster and Bial's Music Hall in 1896. Lured by greater salaries and less arduous working conditions, many performers and personalities, such as Al Jolson, W. C. Fields, Mae West, Charlie Chaplin, Buster Keaton, the Marx Brothers, Jimmy Durante, Bill "Bojangles" Robinson, Edgar Bergen, Fanny Brice, Burns and Allen, and Eddie Cantor, used the prominence gained in live variety performance to vault into the new medium of cinema. In doing so, such performers often exhausted in a few moments of screen time the novelty of an act that might have kept them on tour for several years. Other performers who entered in vaudeville's later years, including Jack Benny, Abbott and Costello, Laurel and Hardy, Kate Smith, Cary Grant, Bob Hope, Milton Berle, Judy Garland, Rose Marie, Sammy Davis Jr., Red Skelton, Larry Storch, Nicola Paone and The Three Stooges, used vaudeville only as a launching pad for later careers. They left live performance before achieving the national celebrity of earlier vaudeville stars, and found fame in new venues.

The line between live and filmed performances was blurred by the number of vaudeville entrepreneurs who made more or less successful forays into the movie business. For example, Alexander Pantages quickly realized the importance of motion pictures as a form of entertainment. He incorporated them in his shows as early as 1902. Later, he entered into a partnership with the Famous Players–Lasky, a major Hollywood production company and an affiliate of Paramount Pictures.

By the late 1920s, most vaudeville shows included a healthy selection of cinema. Earlier in the century, many vaudevillians, cognizant of the threat represented by cinema, held out hope that the silent nature of the "flickering shadow sweethearts" would prevent movies from ever overtaking vaudeville in popularity. However, with the introduction of talking pictures in 1926, the burgeoning film studios removed what had remained the chief difference in favor of live theatrical performance: spoken dialogue. Historian John Kenrick wrote:

Top vaudeville stars filmed their acts for one-time pay-offs, inadvertently helping to speed the death of vaudeville. After all, when "small time" theatres could offer "big time" performers on screen at a nickel a seat, who could ask audiences to pay higher amounts for less impressive live talent? The newly-formed RKO studios took over the famed Orpheum vaudeville circuit and swiftly turned it into a chain of full-time movie theatres. The half-century tradition of vaudeville was effectively wiped out within less than four years.

Inevitably, managers further trimmed costs by eliminating the last of the live performances. Vaudeville also suffered due to the rise of broadcast radio following the greater availability of inexpensive receiver sets later in the decade. Even the hardiest in the vaudeville industry realized the form was in decline; the perceptive understood the condition to be terminal. The standardized film distribution and talking pictures of the 1930s confirmed the end of vaudeville. By 1930, the vast majority of formerly live theatres had been wired for sound, and none of the major studios were producing silent pictures. For a time, the most luxurious theatres continued to offer live entertainment, but most theatres were forced by the Great Depression to economize.

Some in the industry blamed cinema's drain of talent from the vaudeville circuits for the medium's demise. Others argued that vaudeville had allowed its performances to become too familiar to its famously loyal, now seemingly fickle audiences.

There was no abrupt end to vaudeville, though the form was clearly sagging by the late 1920s. Joseph Kennedy Sr. in a hostile buyout, acquired the Keith-Albee-Orpheum Theatres Corporation (KAO), which had more than 700 vaudeville theatres across the United States which had begun showing movies. The shift of New York City's Palace Theatre, vaudeville's center, to an exclusively cinema presentation on 16 November 1932, is often considered to have been the death knell of vaudeville.

Though talk of its resurrection was heard during the 1930s and later, the demise of the supporting apparatus of the circuits and the higher cost of live performance made any large-scale renewal of vaudeville unrealistic.

== Theatre architecture ==
The most striking examples of Gilded Age theatre architecture were commissioned by the big time vaudeville magnates and stood as monuments of their wealth and ambition. Examples of such architecture are the theatres built by impresario Alexander Pantages. Pantages often used architect B. Marcus Priteca (1881–1971), who in turn regularly worked with muralist Anthony Heinsbergen. Priteca devised an exotic, neo-classical style that his employer called "Pantages Greek".

Though classic vaudeville reached a zenith of capitalization and sophistication in urban areas dominated by national chains and commodious theatres, small-time vaudeville included countless more intimate and locally controlled houses. Small-time houses were often converted saloons, rough-hewn theatres, or multi-purpose halls, together catering to a wide range of clientele. Many small towns had purpose-built theatres. A small yet interesting example might include what is called Grange Halls in northern New England, still being used. These are old-fashioned, wooden buildings with creaky, dimly-lit, wooden stages, which were meant to offset the isolation of a farming lifestyle. These stages could offer anything from child performers to contra-dances to visits by Santa to local, musical talent, to homemade foods such as whoopee pies.

== Vaudeville's cultural influence and legacy ==
Some of the most prominent vaudevillians successfully made the transition to cinema, though others were not as successful. Some performers such as Bert Lahr fashioned careers out of combining live performance with radio and film roles. Many others later appeared in the Catskill resorts that constituted the "Borscht Belt".

Vaudeville was instrumental in the success of the newer media of film, radio, and television. Comedies of the new era adopted many of the dramatic and musical tropes of classic vaudeville acts. Film comedies of the 1920s through the 1940s used talent from the vaudeville stage and followed a vaudeville aesthetic of variety entertainment, both in Hollywood and in Asia, including China.

The rich repertoire of the vaudeville tradition was mined for prominent prime-time radio variety shows such as The Rudy Vallée Show. The structure of a single host introducing a series of acts became a popular television style and can be seen consistently in the development of television, from The Milton Berle Show in 1948 to Late Night with David Letterman in the 1980s. The multi-act format had renewed success in shows such as Your Show of Shows with Sid Caesar and The Ed Sullivan Show. Today, performers such as Bill Irwin, a MacArthur Fellow and Tony Award-winning actor, are frequently lauded as "New Vaudevillians". Vaudevillian techniques can commonly be witnessed on television and in movies, remarkably in the recent, worldwide phenomenon of TV shows such as America's Got Talent.

In professional wrestling, there was a noted tag team, based in WWE, called The Vaudevillains.

In 2018, noted film director Christopher Annino, maker of a new silent feature film, Silent Times, founded Vaudeville Con, a gathering to celebrate the history of vaudeville. The first meeting was held in Pawcatuck, Connecticut.

In the Philippines, certain vaudeville elements can be noticed in two programs—Eat Bulaga! and It's Showtime—mainly due to many people seeing vaudeville (bodabil) as a means of performing live acts and integrating noticeable comedic elements in most of their segments, especially at midday.

=== Vaudeville terminology in culture ===
References to vaudeville and the use of its distinctive argot continue throughout North American popular culture. The term "peanut gallery", referring to the cheapest and ostensibly rowdiest seats in the theater, the occupants of which were often known to heckle the performers, led to the coining of phrases such as "no comments from the peanut gallery", "quiet in the peanut gallery", or "throwing peanuts from the gallery" to refer to people who give unwanted criticism or mockery. In 1943, the Howdy Doody children's radio show adopted the name for its live audience of children.

"Peanut gallery" may have been the source of the name for Charles Schulz's comic strip, Peanuts, a name chosen by United Features Syndicate (UFS) as a solution to a trademark issue, but against the wishes of Schulz, who bitterly resented and never understood the name. Schulz had wanted to keep the name of his previous strip, Li'l Folks. However, UFS pointed out that the name was too similar to other strips such as Little Folks and Li'l Abner. Thus, Peanuts was chosen. A similar term was introduced to Brazilian football by coach Luiz Felipe Scolari. He called Palmeiras' complaining audience that sat in the closest seats "peanut gang" (Portuguese: Turma do Amendoim). C. J. Dennis's poem "The Play" from Songs of a Sentimental Bloke, recapitulating the suicide scene from Romeo and Juliet, ends bathetically with "'Peanuts or lollies!' sez a boy upstairs."

== Archives ==
The records of the Tivoli Theatre are housed at the State Library of Victoria, Melbourne, Australia, with additional personal papers of vaudevillian performers from the Tivoli Theatre, including extensive costume and set design holdings, held by the Performing Arts Collection, Arts Centre Melbourne.

The American Vaudeville Museum, one of the largest collections of vaudeville memorabilia, is located at the University of Arizona.

The Elgin and Winter Garden Theatres in Toronto houses the world's largest collection of vaudeville props and scenery.

The Benjamin Franklin Keith and Edward F. Albee Collection housed at the University of Iowa includes a large collection of managers' report books recording and commenting on the lineup and quality of the acts each night.

== See also ==
- Cabaret
- Chapeaugraphy
- Chautauqua
- Concert party (entertainment)
- For Me and My Gal (film)
- Native Americans in vaudeville
- Nightclub
- Revue
- Tab show
- Tivoli circuit
- Tom show
- Vaudeville Bellydance
