= Old Newberry County Courthouse =

- Old Courthouse
- U.S. National Register of Historic Places
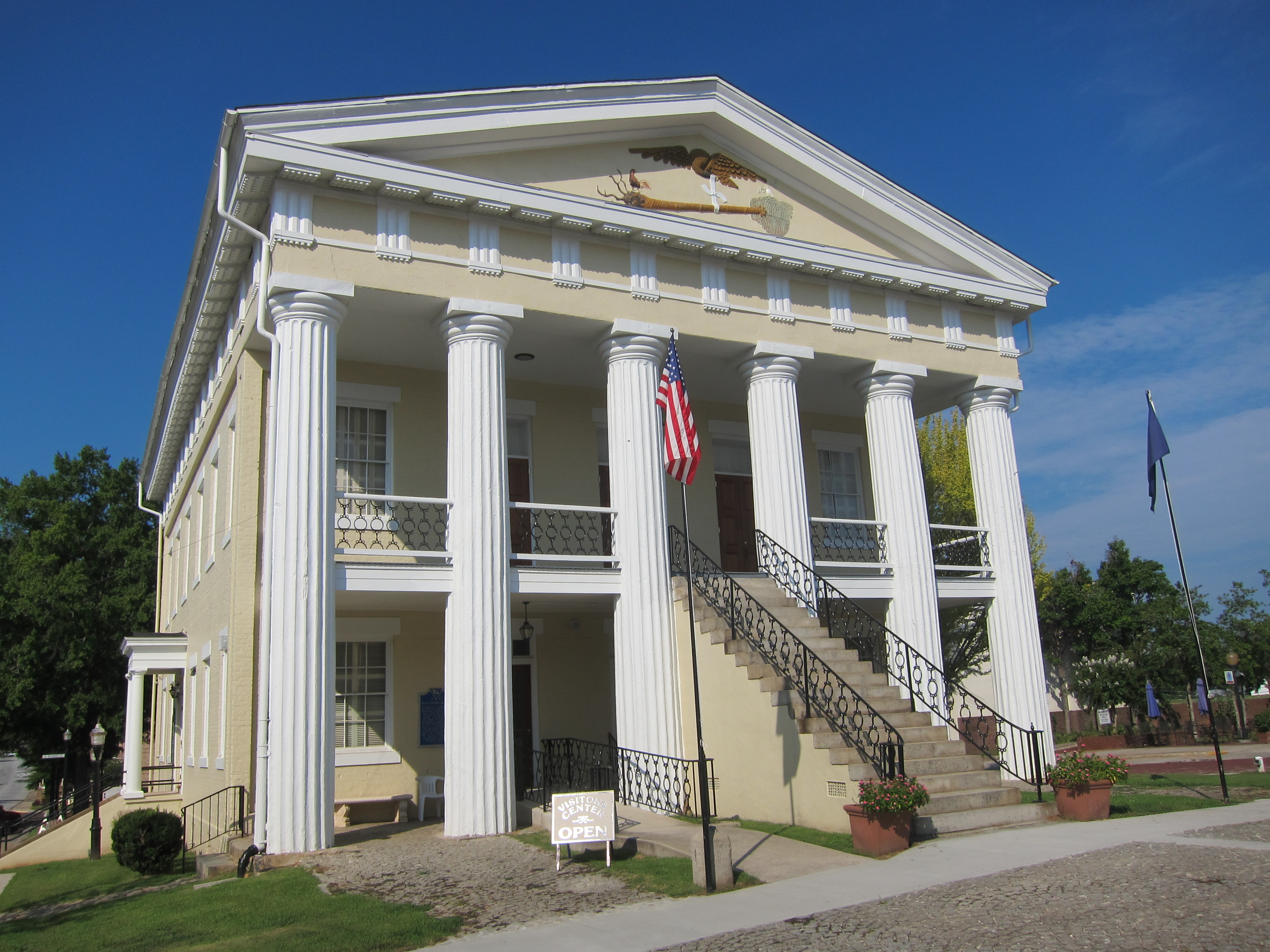

- Location within South Carolina Location within the United States
- Location: 1207 Caldwell St., Newberry, South Carolina
- Coordinates: 34°16′31″N 81°37′16″W
- Area: 0.5 acres (0.20 ha)
- Built: 1852
- Architect: Graves, Jacob; Darmon, James
- Architectural style: Greek Revival
- NRHP reference No.: 71000791
- Added to NRHP: August 19, 1971

The Old Newberry County Courthouse at 1207 Caldwell St. in Newberry, South Carolina was built in 1852. The courthouse was designed by Jacob Graves and constructed by James Darmon, and later remodeled in 1880 by builder Osborne Wells. It was constructed as part of a series of five county courthouses, in use from its construction until 1906. It was listed on the National Register of Historic Places in 1971.

== History ==
The courthouse was originally built in 1852 by James Darmon, based on a design by Jacob Graves, an architect who previously resided in Columbia, South Carolina. Very little is known of Graves' background or education, though he is a native of New Hampshire. The courthouse was constructed as the fourth in a series of five courthouses used in Newberry County, with it seeing use between its construction in 1852 and 1906, two years before the current county courthouse was constructed.

Graves' design for the courthouse is an outstanding example of Greek Revival architecture, utilizing many techniques of this style on the exterior of the building commonly seen within Greek Revival, such as stucco brick, fluted Tuscan columns, and a massive triangular pediment. Additionally, much of the design of the entablature is heavily based on designs of the Doric order. In 1880 during Reconstruction, Newberry builder Osborne Wells was given the task of remodeling the courthouse. His additions to the exterior include adding two-columned porticos along the side entrances, and a bas-relief mounted on the frontal pediment.
