= Trixie Friganza =

American actress (1870–1955)

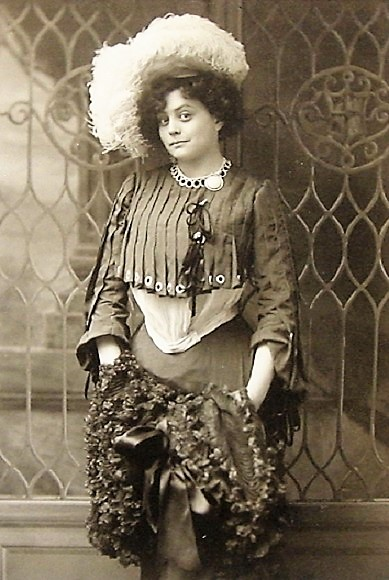
- Friganza in The Chaperons (1902)
- Born: Delia O'Callaghan; November 29, 1870; Grenola, Kansas, U.S.
- Died: February 27, 1955 (aged 84); Flintridge, California, U.S.
- Resting place: Calvary Cemetery (Los Angeles)
- Occupation: Actress
- Years active: 1889–1940
- Spouse(s): “John Doe” (1899–1900); Dr. William J.M. Barry (1901–1911); Charles A. Goettler (1912–1914)

Trixie Friganza (born Delia O'Callaghan; November 29, 1870 – February 27, 1955) was an American actress. She began her career as an operetta soubrette, working her way from the chorus to starring in musical comedies to having her own feature act on the vaudeville circuit.

She transitioned to film in the early 1920s mostly playing small characters that were quirky and comedic. She retired from the stage in 1940 due to health concerns. She spent her last years teaching drama to young women in a convent school and when she died she left everything to the convent. She became a highly sought after comic actress after the success of The Chaperons (she played "Aramanthe Dedincourt") and is best known for her stage roles of Caroline Vokes (or Vokins?) in The Orchid, Mrs. Radcliffe in The Sweetest Girl in Paris, for multiple roles in The Passing Show of 1912, and her run as a vaudeville headliner. During the height of her career, she used her fame to promote social, civic, and political issues of importance, such as self-love and the Suffragist movement.

== Early life ==
Friganza was born in Grenola, Kansas, to a mother Margaret Friganza of Spanish descent and an Irish father Cornelius O'Callaghan, and was raised in Cincinnati, Ohio. She had two younger sisters, and along with their mother, these four women were a tightly knit unit growing up. She was educated at St. Patrick's School in Cincinnati, beginning what would become a lifelong allegiance to the Catholic Church. When asked by a reporter why she took the name Friganza she replied, “I didn't marry it”; Friganza, in fact, is her mother's maiden name (Margaret Jane Friganza), which she both liked and found to be suitable for the stage. A friend and colleague of hers by the name of Digby Bell (of the Digby Bell Opera Co.), christened her “Trixie” early on and the name stuck, for she had never been fond of the name Delia.

She began working at a young age (12 or 13) in order to help support her family, securing a cash girl position at Pogue's store, and earning $3 per week. When she was age 16, she was promoted to the handkerchief counter at Pogue's and her salary went up to around $4.50–$5.00 per week, which was a substantial increase in income for her. It was her boyfriend at the time who encouraged her not to waste her talents as a singer and actress and to venture onto the stage where she could double or triple her current salary.

Motivated by the desire to provide more for her family, and the responsibility she must have felt due to being the oldest of the three daughters, she auditioned for a chorus girl position in The Pearl of Pekin' (1889). She got the part but in order to avoid any embarrassment to her mother and family (stage careers for women were not considered reputable at the time) she opted to begin performing once the production moved up to Cleveland, Ohio.

Her mother was inconsolable and devastated at her daughter's decision to take to the stage. She notified Cleveland authorities who brought Trixie before a Cleveland judge to justify her decision to work in theater. She presented such a compelling and rational case for this career move (she had to prove to the judge that she was neither “silly” nor “stage-struck”, that this was a business move) that the judge granted her clemency and telegraphed her mother saying that Trixie was doing the right thing. She remained on stage in some form or another for the next fifty years.

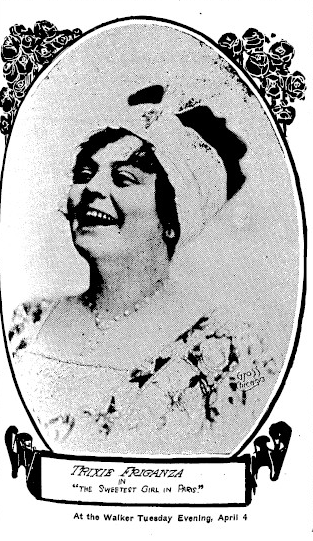
Friganza in 1911

== Personal life ==
Friganza was civic minded and socially attuned. She aligned herself with women's suffrage and the promotion of a positive female body image. On October 28, 1908, Trixie attended a women's suffrage rally at New York City Hall where she delivered a speech for women's rights. She donated money to the cause and repeatedly went on record as an advocate for women's rights, equality and independence. Her own personal life is consistent with those ideals; having taken her mother's maiden name and refusing to leave her career in spite of marriage, she defied society's proprieties and norms, modeling what Susan Glenn calls "New Woman".

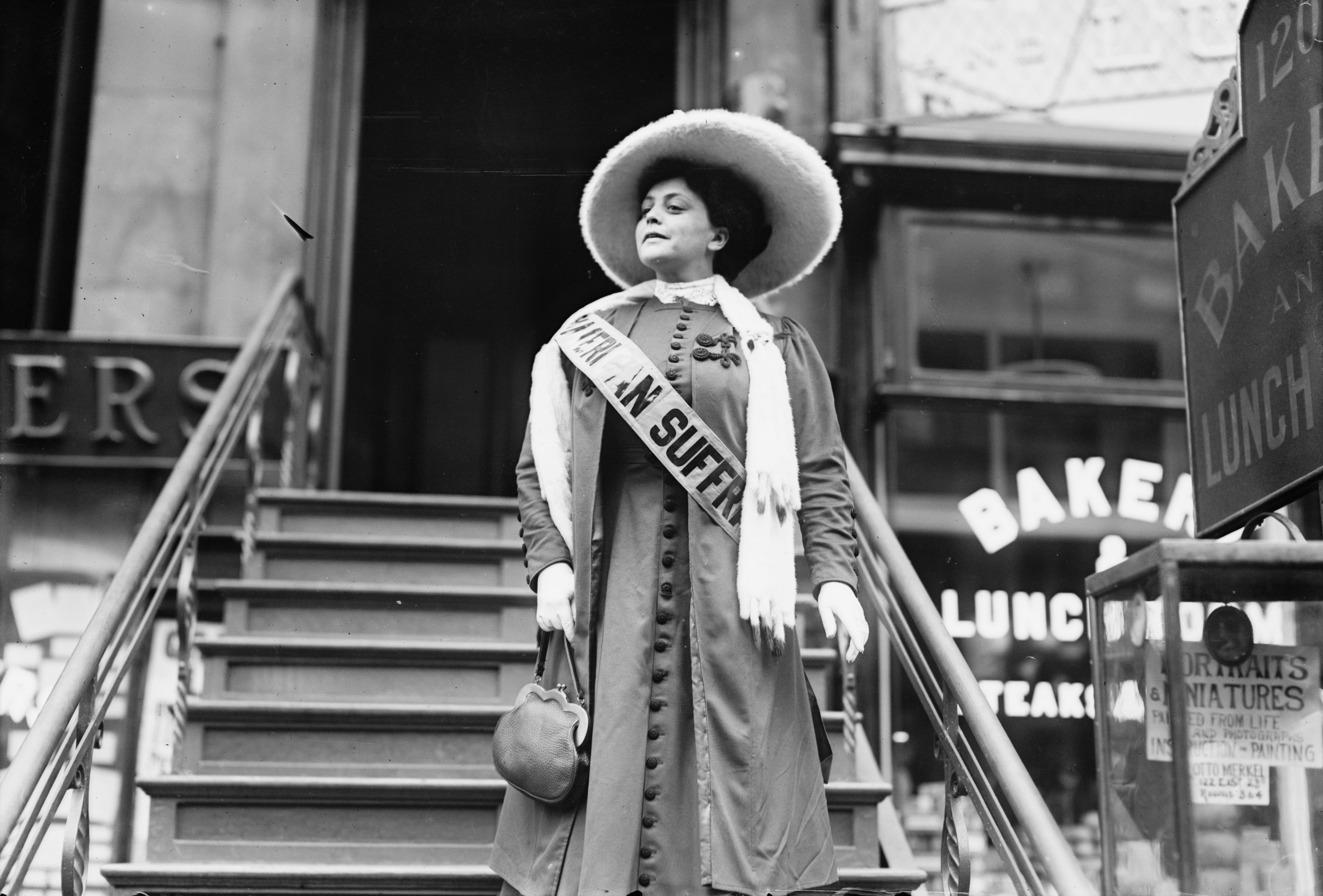
Friganza at 1908 suffragette demonstration

Younger women were concerned with sexual freedom and equality, and demonstrated this by experimenting with "public behavior and new gender roles" (Glenn 6). Friganza used her celebrity status to promote and further the rights of women as well as other causes such as promoting the arts to the economically disenfranchised. Newspapers noted that many performances in which she was involved held performances for orphans and children from lower income families.

Although Friganza used her occasional single status to sing songs (like "No Wedding Bells for Me") and make jokes about being desperate for a man, she had many beaus. Her first marriage was to an unknown man in the late 1890s and newspapers reported that she was divorced from this "John Doe" in September 1899. Her second marriage, which took place during the summer of 1901, was to a Dr. Barry, the physician hired aboard the steamship Bohemian, upon which the cast sailed from Boston. The wedding was held at Stermin's Hotel and those in attendance were fellow actors and cast members of Belle of Bohemia. She and the doctor were divorced several years later, though the exact date is unknown. On August 20, 1909, tabloids reported that Friganza was to be engaged to Nat M. Wills, but nothing more was said of this and she did not in fact marry the man. Her third marriage, taking place in New York on March 10, 1912, was to her manager, Charles A. Goettler. She filed for a divorce in the summer of 1914 on the grounds of "failure to provide" and "cruelty". She briefly dated Jack Norworth, another vaudeville performer and lyricist, and was the inspiration for the "Katie Casey" figure in his famous song "Take Me Out to the Ball Game". Records do not indicate that she was ever married again. During all of her marriages she never changed her name and was adamant about continuing her career in show business. None of the relationships yielded any children for her.

== Later life ==
Trixie Friganza suffered from arthritis beginning in the 1930s and because of it by 1940 could no longer work in Hollywood or on stage. In 1940 she turned over all of her assets and money to the Flintridge Sacred Heart Academy, a convent and school in La Canada Flintridge, California. She taught drama there as long as she could until her health prevented her from doing so. She reportedly had a room in the institution that overlooked the city of Pasadena where every year she would watch the football games at the Rose Bowl stadium.

At the age of 79, in an interview with the Los Angeles Times, she confessed to enjoying watching TV a great deal saying “that's where vaudeville has gone – into television” (Slide, Encyclopedia… pg. 199). She correctly identified the many comic and dramatic tropes borrowed from the stage and incorporated into American cinema and television. Despite her popularity, theatrical achievements and record of stage and cinematic productions, she died of arthritis in relative obscurity in Flintridge at age 84 on February 27, 1955. She bequeathed all her possessions to the academy and left a legacy to the American public.

Orson Welles would share on an episode of The Dick Cavett Show that his playboy "inventor" and gambler father Richard Head Welles once emergered from a house fire carrying a cockatoo and a signed photo of Friganza, which Welles described as his father's "prized possessions".

== Theatre career (1889–1917) ==
Trixie toured with many theatre companies in the coming years working her way from roles in the chorus to more prominently featured roles with speaking parts. Part of her success can be attributed to her constant willingness to step in and take over roles when others fell ill or could not appear. These instances provided her an opportunity to demonstrate her ability and ingenuity. She impressed agents, audiences and other actors alike with her stellar singing voice and ability to command audiences with her humorous interpretation of characters.

She worked mainly with musical comedies, however, she did perform in a few dramatic productions, opting to return to comedic performance relatively soon thereafter. Below is a list in chronological order of the productions with which she was involved. Supplementary information (roles; theatre company; additional cast members; theatre technicians; directors; producers; personal statements or experiences), when available, is provided. (dates placed in italics are guesstimated based on the chronology of her performances, meaning the performance likely took place in that year but research did not provide a hard date to confirm this)

- Pearl of Pekin' – 1889
- The Tar and the Tartar – 1890 – Carlton Opera Co.

- Understudied for Laura Joyce Bell and took her part when she was unable to appear.

- Jupiter (comic opera) – 1891 – Carlton Opera Co.

- Role of “Ganymede”
- George Odell in the Annals of the New York Stage, said of Trixie “The attendant Ganymede of Trixie Friganza, in later years a very heavy maiden, amuses me.”

- The Mascot (comic opera) – 1892–1894 – Digby Bell Opera Co.

- Presented at Palmer's Theater in NYC running from July 18th – October 1st
- Role of “Frederic, Prince of Pisa”
- Also starring Henry E. Dixey

- Prince Kam or A Trip to Venus (musical comedy) – 1893–1894

- Role of “Isis”
- Written by C.A. Byrne and Louis Harrison
- Bill available from the Park Theatre (Robinson Locke Collection, New York City Public Library for the Performing Arts)

- One Christmas Night (drama) – 1894
- The Little Trooper – 1894

- Chorus role along with Della Fox
- Opened at the Casino in New York, August 30

- The Little Joker (comedy) – 1894–1895

- Written by Carrie W. Colburn
- Offered the lead role of “Kate” by Colburn who saw her performing in the chorus and wanted her to star in her play, which became T.F's first starring role on stage.

- Fleur de Lis – 1895

- Performed with Della Fox
- Production opened at the Palmer's Theater in New York City

- A Trip to Chinatown – 1896–1897

- Role of the “Widow” (principal)

- La Poupee – 1897

- Role of “Henry” (boy's part– principal)
- Performed with Anna Held
- Show opened in Lyrie, New York, October 9

- The Man in the Moon – 1898–1899

- Role in the front row of the chorus

- The Country Sport – 1898–1899

- Role in the chorus
- Understudied for Kate Davis and got to play the principal when she fell ill

- The Casino Girl – 1900

- Opened in Casino, NY; had a chorus role

- The Belle of Bohemia – 1900–1901

- Role of “Mrs. Muggins” (principal)
- First appearance in London at the Apollo in this role – February 21, 1901

- The Whirl of the Town – 1901

- Role of “Samanthy Brown”
- Performed with Henry E. Dixey and Madge Lessing
- Opened in London, September 11, 1901

- The Rounders – 1901

- One of the four daughters (principal)

- The Girl From Paris – 1901–1902

- Role of “Julie Bonbon” (principal); Show toured back in the U.S. and in Montreal

- The Belle of New York – 1902

- Role of “Salvation Army girl”
- When asked to kick a tambourine as the character does in the German translation of the play, she “refused to stultify her artistic conscience in that way”

- The Chaperons (musical comedy) – 1902

- Role of “Aramanthe Dedincourt” (principal)
- Director Frank L. Perley; music by Isidore Witmark; book and lyrics by Frederic Ranken
- Opened in New York, NY on June 5th
- Performed with Walter Jones, Eddie Redway, Lou Middleton, Harry Conor, Eva Tanguay, and May Boley
- F.C. Havenmeyer, a wealthy 71-year-old man, followed the production around the country showering the female actresses with gifts from Tiffany's, T.F. included.

- Sally in Our Alley – 1903

- Role of “Sally” (principal)
- Played at McVicker's Theater

- The Darling of the Gallery Gods – 1903

- Role of “Whoa San” (principal)

- The Dress Parade – 1903

- Role of “DuBarry” (principal)
- Opened in Crystal Gardens, New York, June 22nd

- The Prince of Pilsen – 1903

- Role of “Mrs. Madison Crocker” (principal)
- Opened on Broadway, New York, July 4, 1903 and in Shaftesbury, London, May 14, 1904
- Wears a gown covered with roses which was her “invention.”

- The Sultan of Sulu – 1904

- Role of the “Widow”

- Higgledy-Piggledy – 1905 – Joe Weber's All Star Co. or Joe Weber Music Hall Stock Co.

- Role of “Mimi de Chartreuse” (principal)
- Opened in Weber's M.H., New York, February 13

- The Girl From Paris – 1906

- Revived role of “Julie Bonbon” (principal)
- Opened in Manhattan Beach, New York, July 21st

- Twiddle-Twaddle – 1905

- Role of “Matilda Grabfelder” (principal)
- Opened at Joe Weber's Theatre

- The Three Graces – 1906 – Kohl & Castle

- Opened at the Chicago Opera House and went on tour

- His Honor the Mayor – 1906

- Role of “Katrinka” (principal)
- Performed with Harry Kelly

- The Orchid – 1906–1907

- Role of “Caroline Vokes” (or Vokins?) (principal)
- Performed with Eddie Foy
- Opened in Herald Square Theatre, New York, April 8

- The Girl from Yama – 1907

- Role of “The Girl from Yama” (principal)

- The American Idea (musical comedy) – 1908

- Role of “Mrs. Waxtapper (principal)
- Written by George M. Cohan
- Costarring George Beban
- First public performance at the Star Theatre in Buffalo, New York, September 7
- Opened in New York, New York, October 5

- The Sweetest Girl in Paris (musical comedy) – 1910–1911

- Role of “Mrs. Ned Radcliffe (principal)
- Opened at the Chicago LaSalle Opera House, August 8 and went on tour

- The Passing Show of 1912 – 1912–1913 – Winter Garden Co.

- Roles of “Keokuk,” “Julia Scream,” and “Nancy Sikes”
- Opened in Winter Garden, New York, July 22 and went on tour
- A Parody of Oliver Twist

- Town Topics (musical comedy) – 1915

- Role of “Albany Dayline”
- Conceived of and staged by Ned Wayburn

- Canary Cottage – 1916–1917

- Role of “Blanche Moss”

== Vaudeville career (1906–1932) ==
Trixie Friganza easily made the transition from musical comedy to vaudeville though her first vaudeville appearance is a contested matter. The newspaper Brooklyn Eagle claims that her debut was at Keeney's Theatre, May 6, 1905, whereas the Encyclopedia of Vaudeville lists her first appearance at the Hammerstein's Theatre in New York City, in the summer of 1906. Regardless, from that time forward she shuttled back and forth between the theatre and the vaudeville stage until 1912–1913 when she began working primarily within the vaudeville circuit. Her fame as a comic actress buoyed her success and she soon became a headliner, given top billing in the shows.

During her career she appeared at B. F. Keith's Palace Theatre in New York no fewer than ten times, headlining five times from April 1924 through April 1929. Records from the Theatre documented performers' success by rating their reception and applause, counting the number of laughs received, and how they finished. Records from appearances during the week ending April 28, 1918 indicate that the audience's response to Trixie Friganza was huge, where she elicited a total of 29 laughs, second only to Charlie Chaplin's motion picture A Dog's Life. In 1919, she toured with an act called At a Block Party, which featured songs and witty repartee representative of an actual city block party. Frederick James Smith, writing for the Dramatic Mirror (February 8, 1919) called her show “a vigorous comedy act” (Slide, Selected Vaudeville Criticism, pg. 88). During one appearance at the Palace, Variety called her act, “My Little Bag O' Trix,” “a riotous hit” (March, 1920). Other one-woman shows included the “Trixie Friganza Road Show” (1921) and numerous others that she performed untitled.

She performed many successful acts, many of which revolved around her plus-sized figure, which she described as the “perfect forty-six”, and the trials and tribulations of love (Slide, Encyclopedia of Vaudeville, pg. 199). She was an advocate for being plump, topping the scales herself at 180 lbs, and went as far as suggesting that her success as a comic correlated directly to her mass. On July 21, 1915, the Dramatic Mirror reported successful completion of a 75-week tour on the Keith vaudeville circuit; during this time, she never missed a performance, never was late or was involved in any altercations with the stage or house manager.

In 1929, Trixie made a 10-minute Vitaphone short titled "My Bag o'Trix" as seen on TCM and available in the Warner Bros. DVD of The Jazz Singer. The first minute of the picture is lost to nitrate decomposition, but the entire Vitaphone soundtrack survives, preserving a glimpse of what must have been part of her vaudeville act of the time.

== Filmography ==
- Mind Over Motor (1923)
- The Charmer (1925)
- Proud Flesh (1925)
- The White Desert (1925)
- The Coming of Amos (1925)
- The Road to Yesterday (1925)
- Borrowed Finery (1925)
- The Waiter from the Ritz (1926) (not released)
- Monte Carlo (1926)
- Almost a Lady (1926)
- The Whole Town's Talking (1926)
- A Racing Romeo (1927)
- Gentlemen Prefer Blondes (1928)
- Thanks for the Buggy Ride (1928)
- My Bag o'Trix (1929) (short)
- Free and Easy (1930)
- Strong and Willing (1930) (short)
- The Unholy Three (1930) (uncredited)
- Myrt and Marge (1933)
- Wanderer of the Wasteland (1935)
- Silks and Saddles (1936)
- A Star Is Born (1937)
- How to Undress in Front of Your Husband (1937)
- If I Had My Way (1940) cameo role in Bing Crosby film

== Written works ==
During her career, Trixie Friganza published articles and poems in newspapers, some of which still exist today in the Robinson Locke Collection at the New York Public Library for the Performing Arts. Those still available (mostly on microfilm) are listed below accompanied by a short description of content.

- “Ballad” – From the “Trixie Ballads,” published in 1903 in an unknown newspaper
- “Comediennes Chosen By Weight” – April 1907, Newspaper Article

- This article written by Trixie argued that in the future female comics would be selected not based on reputation, rather on their excess pounds. She recognized the value of having thin actresses play leading dramatic and romantic roles, but if any woman would succeed in comedy it would be the larger lady of the two.

- “Six Trixie Friganza Tricks Which Make Women Laugh” – May 16, 1909, Chicago Tribune

- The article derived from an interview in which the reporter quoted T.F. at length, her dialogue comprising over 70% of the text. In it she shares her desire to play to women's sense of humor, encouraging their laughter, and the theatrical strategies necessary to do so.

- “These Stories” – June 26, 1910, published in an unknown newspaper

- A collection of humorous short anecdotes, most of which seem to derive from real life experiences and place the woman as the humorist or satirist.

- “Bromides” – February 3, 1915, poem in New Jersey Star

- The poem documented the internal questions and worries of a stage actor.

== Nicknames ==
- "The Cincinnati Girl"
- "The Perpetual Flapper" dubbed this by The Billboard in 1931
- "The Champagne Girl"
