= Irving Jones =

American comedian and songwriter

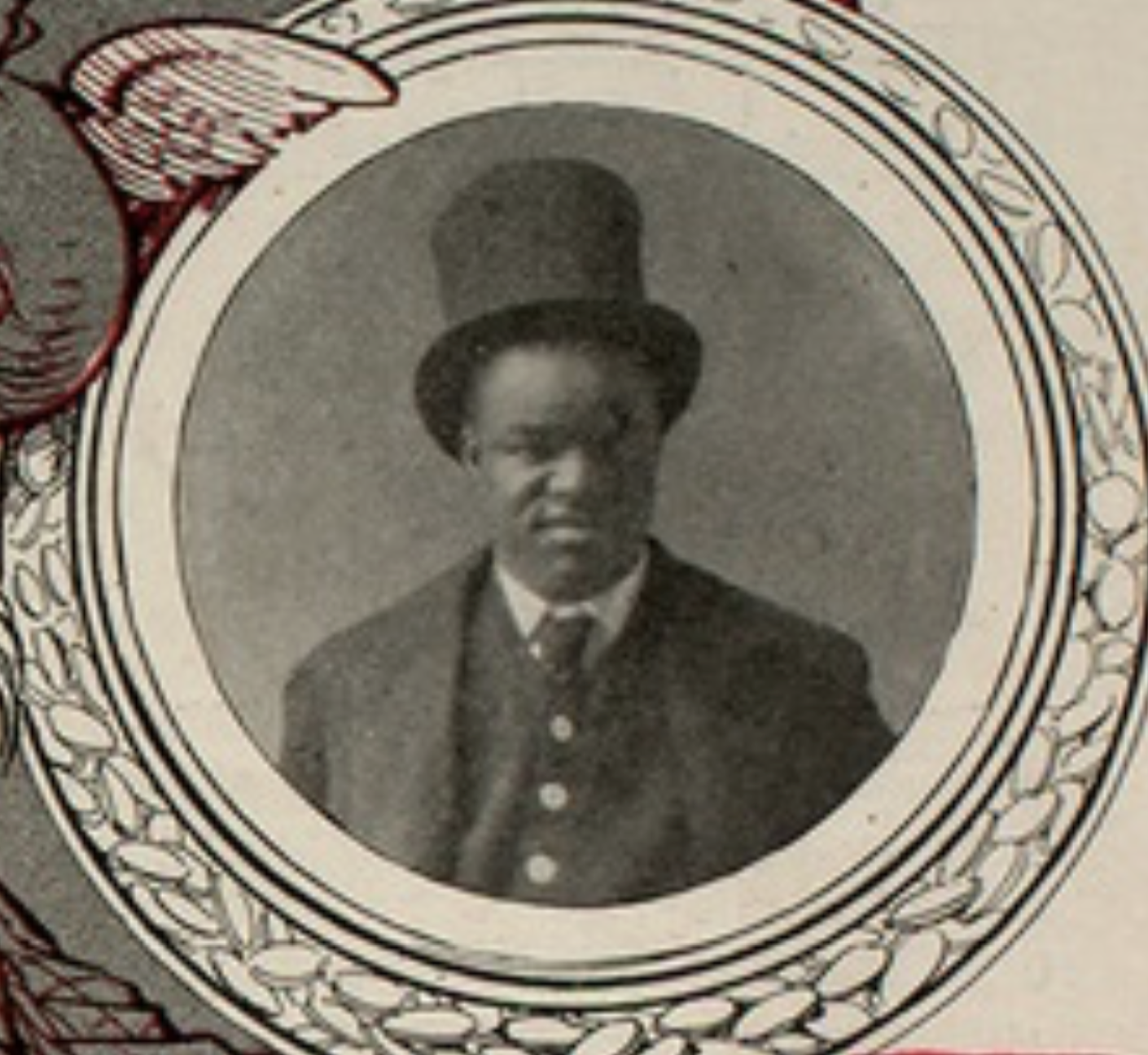
- Jones in 1901

Background information
- Born: 1873; New York City, U.S.
- Died: March 9, 1932 (aged 58–59) Harlem, New York City, U.S.
- Genre: Coon songs
- Occupations: Comedian; songwriter
- Years active: 1877–1932

Irving Jones (1873 – March 9, 1932) was an American comedian and songwriter who specialized in a ragtime musical genre known as coon songs during their heyday in the late 19th and early 20th century. He sold close to 50 songs, many of which became enormously popular. A successful comic throughout his career, he has been hailed as a pioneer of ragtime music and both praised and criticized for his ability to take advantage of the popularity of the coon song genre, which often used stereotypical portrayals of African-Americans.

== Life and career ==
=== 19th Century ===
Jones was born in New York City in 1873 and began his stage career as a child. While still a teenager, he began working with Sam T. Jack's Creole Show during their first tour in 1890. That same year he married his wife Sadie, who also performed with the Creole Show.

The Creole Show broke with the old plantation show format and introduced new urban elements. In the show, Jones composed and sung his own songs and performed comic monologues. His song and dance numbers like Postman reflected the new cosmopolitan sensibility of African-American vaudeville performance . In his early years, he was known mostly as a comic and was described as "a charming hustler" who expertly took charge of the craps games on the Creole Show's railroad sleeping car.

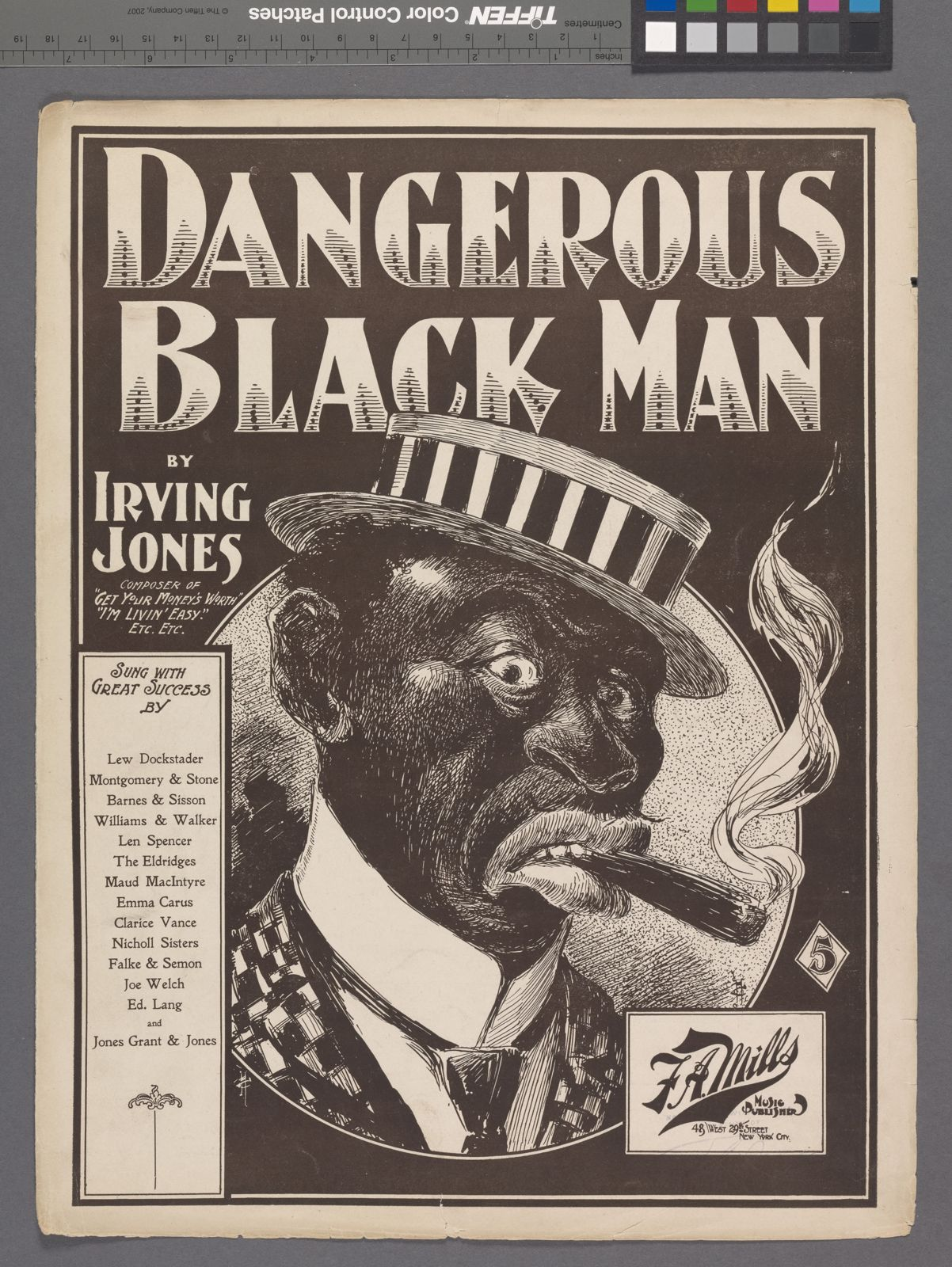
Dangerous Black Man by Irving Jones. Jones used his wit to capitalize on the stereotypes of the "Coon Songs" of his era: "I'm a dangerous black man," he sang, "on my dignity I stand/I'm honored as a dangerous black man/because I'm a man."

Shortly after Jones began his show business career, "coon songs" exploded in popularity. These songs, the first to be labeled ragtime, were written in 2/4 time, with a four bar intro, two bar vamp, followed by two or three verses and a sixteen bar chorus. Written and performed by both Black and White performers, often in Blackface, they used the derogatory term "coon" in their lyrics to refer to Black people. They relied on earlier Minstrel stereotypes of Black people as gaudy and ignorant, but added new stereotypes of violence and licentiousness. Watermelon, chicken, and razors were often mentioned. For Black performers, said one historian, it was "the classic situation of blacks donning the white-defined mask of blackness, using the racial conventions of mainstream entertainment to gain public recognition."

These songs were initially hugely popular among younger white audiences in Northern cities, though less so with older Southern whites. They also found favor with some African-Americans who appreciated their pointed humor and boisterous anger, compared to earlier, more sentimental minstrel songs. Black songwriters used the genre to add irony as well as political and social commentary, and black audiences understood some of the double meanings in the songs in a way that most whites didn't. Other Black critics and composers, however, lamented and lambasted the rise of the coon song genre and its use of derogatory language and negative stereotypes.

Jones "wrote coon songs exclusively" and "rode the fad until its demise." He got his songwriting start in 1894, when he wrote and performed a parody of a popular ballroom dance, which he called The Possumala Dance. He performed the song during his comedy routine with the Creole Show. This was the first song he sold. The song was picked up by fellow performer Ernest Hogan and rewritten as Pa Ma La, which became wildly successful.

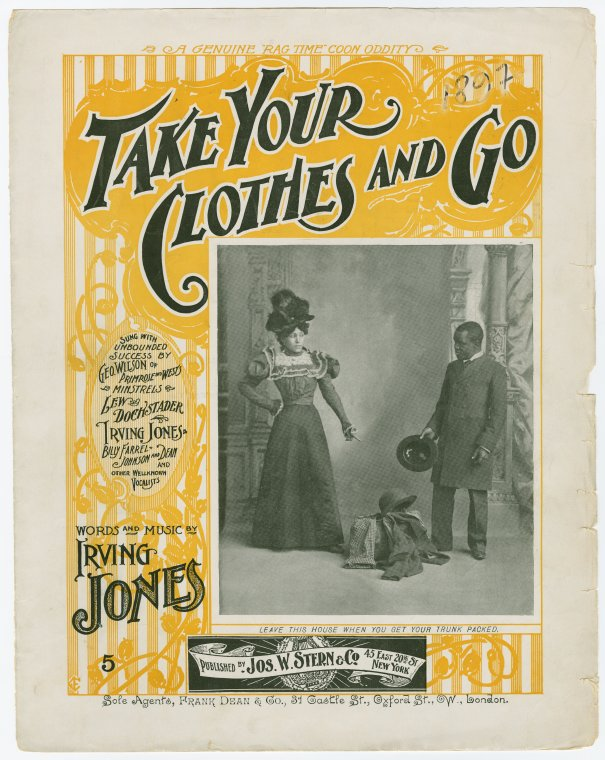
Cover for sheet music for 1897 song Take Your Clothes and Go by Irving Jones

With the introduction of published sheet music in the 1890s, the syncopated ragtime rhythms created by African-Americans went mainstream, and Jones' songs and lyrics were printed by Tin Pan Alley publishers and sold in multiple copies. "Take Your Clothes and Go" and the answer song, "Let Me Bring My Clothes Back Home", published in 1898, became hugely popular as they were picked up by other performers, black and white, on the minstrel show circuit. "Take Your Clothes and Go" sold 100,000 copies of sheet music in two years.

In 1895-1897 Jones joined Isham's Octaroons company. Coon songs were reaching the zenith of their popularity in the late 90s; Jones rode the wave, selling his songs for $50 to $100 each to different publishers. Despite the popularity of his songs, Jones could not read or write music and "probably lost more songs than he sold" to white song publishers who frequented the clubs where Black songwriters were performing and stole their songs.

In 1898, Jones was invited to perform for Gussie Davis's Darkest America, where he introduced another hit song, "Get Your Money's Worth". By 1899, he had sold about 20 songs to more than a dozen publishers, including "Give me back my clothes," "If They Fought the War with Razors", and "I'm Living Easy."

=== 20th century ===
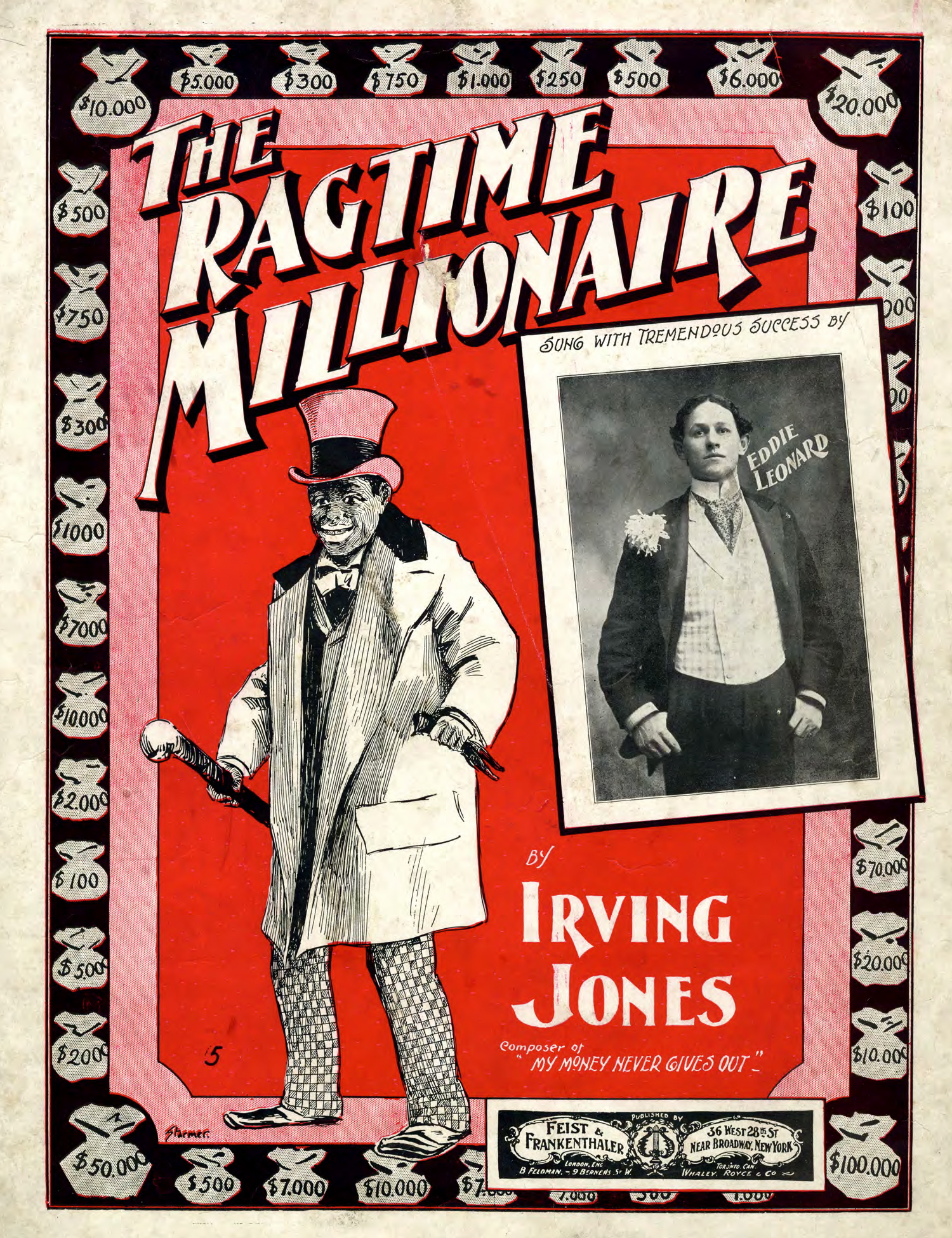
Ragtime Millionaire Cover

In 1900, Jones signed on with the traveling Black Patti Troubadours and released "My Money Never Gives Out". He followed that up with another sale, "I'm a Ragtime Millionaire", which had one of the first lyric references to "having the blues" in any song. Also in 1900, he played the leading role in a short-lived operetta called "Jus Lak White Fo'ks" by Will Marion Cook and Paul Laurence Dunbar. He also started his own Vaudeville Act, "Irving Jones and Charley Johnson, Two Cut-Ups" later adding his wife Sadie in "Jones, Grant and Jones." Jones sang "Home Ain't Nothing Like This" in New York in 1902. The song became another hit and was sung again by Ernest Hogan.

Jones wrote his last song, called "I've Lost My Appetite for Chicken", in 1904. In 1908, a song he had written earlier, "Under the Chicken Tree", was his last publication. By the early 20th century, both black and white audiences were beginning to reject the term "coon songs, but Jones' comedy and songs continued to be popular into the 1920s. One critic said that white performers hated having to compete with him on the same bill. He had a "chesty boisterous" onstage persona, but was described as shy with self-deprecating humor in person. He lived to see some of his songs not only get reproduced but become some of the most popular on the Race Records of the 1920s. Unfortunately, since he had sold his songs piecemeal, he never received any royalties for the recordings.

Jones stayed active as a comedian until his death on March 9, 1932, in New York City.

== Themes and critical reception ==
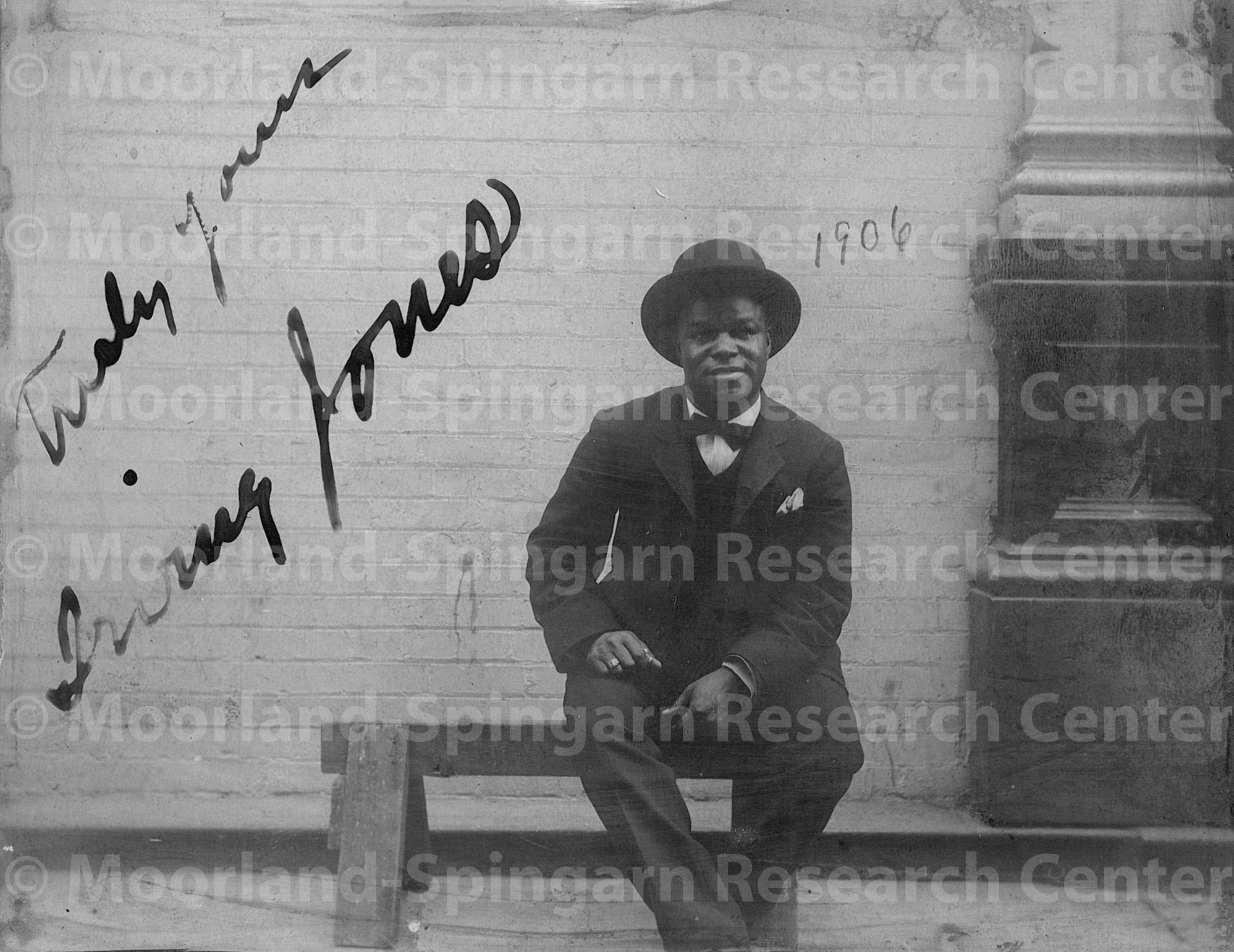
Photo of songwriter and comedian Irving Jones, 1906

Jones' songs appealed to whites and to the Black middle class. He frequently wrote about themes of money and of rejection, as in "You Don't Handle Nuff Money For Me", "You Ain't Landlord No More". Passing as white was another theme he tackled. He was well known for the sardonic humor in his songs. He made fun of Ernest Hogan's popular but often disparaged "All Coons Look Alike to Me", with "All Birds Look Like Chickens to Me."

"All birds look like chicken to me/ Crows look like black hens to me/ Some birds are raised for a prize/ But a knife and fork make em all one size/ You people say quails are chickens you see/

but they look like Lilliputian hens to me."

Historian Paul Oliver notes that in this song, as in others, Jones uses Quail as a symbol for the good life. In another verse about living well, from Ragtime Millionaire, he sings:

"Every tooth in my head is gold/ Make those boys look icy cold/ I brush my teeth with diamond dust/ And I don't care if the bank would bust/ All you little people take your hats off to me/

Cause I'm a ragtime millionaire."

Jones was praised by some critics as "the very best interpreter of modern ragtime ballad and one of the most accomplished composers of songs of that class". But I. McCorker of the Indianapolis Freeman said in 1902 that those who praised him were confusing talent with capability and fame with 'notoriety. Jones, he said, "was grinding out coon conceits with a fecund mind." Corker admitted however, that there were so few avenues available for Black performers to make money that he was glad that Jones "had bagged some coin of the realm."

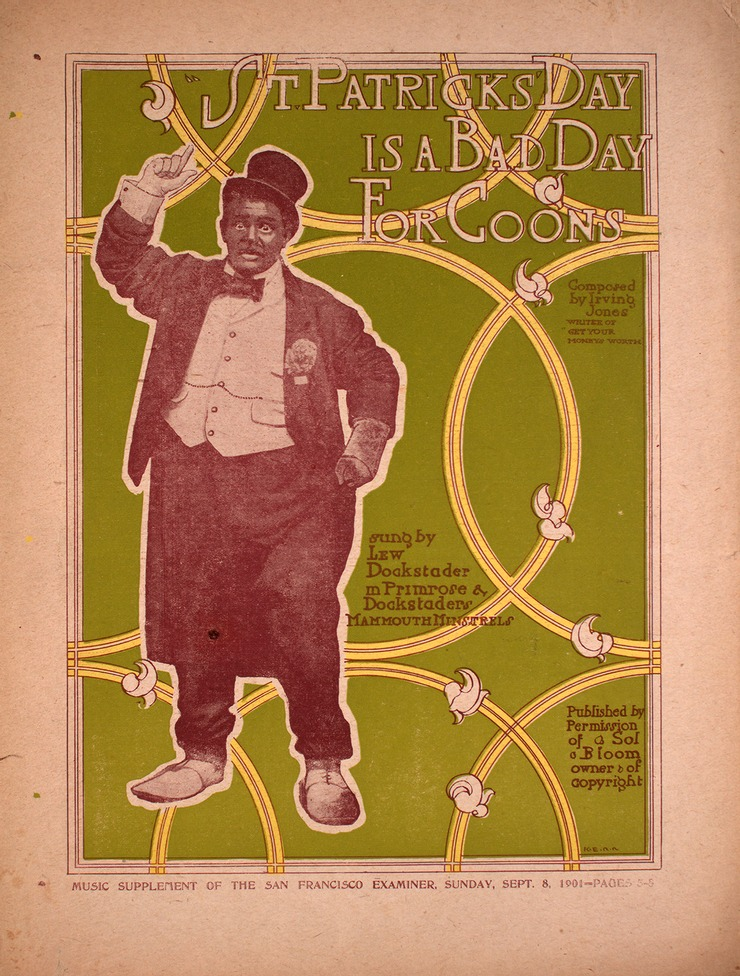
Jones used barbed social commentary on racism in songs like St. Patrick's Day is a Bad Day for Coons

Jones's songs were not just popular for their catchy tunes and "swinging rhythms" which made them easy to learn, but also for his barbed social commentary as in "When a Coon Sits in the President's Chair" and "Saint Patrick's Day is a Bad Day for Coons." He also used comically veiled social commentary in his descriptions of Black life in Jim Crow America, with songs like "I Never Seen Such Hard Luck Before", "Home Ain't Nothing Like This". He drew from African-American folklore in his ballads like Pa Me La and wrote in the authentic idioms of Black Americans of the time.

Another Indianapolis Freeman writer gave him high praise as a comic. "My, who would not laugh at this human wit?" wrote Cary B Lewis in 1910. "He enjoys a unique method, which, aside from his ability as a comedian, he is a wit; his monologue is full of bright, characteristic philosophy, showing close study of the humorous Negro character and his delineations were clearly defined as a well-cut cameo. He was simply immense."

Composer Will Marian Cook cited him in 1922 as one of the Black pioneers of ragtime music: "The public was tired of sing song samey mother sister father sentimental songs. Ragtime offered unique rhythms, curious groupings of words and melodies which gave the zest of unexpectedness."

Paul Oliver in Songsters and Saints claimed Jones was probably the most popular of the ragtime songsters, adding "few other composers of such importance within a genre have been so neglected by historians of popular music."

Despite the success of his songs, Jones never actually became "the ragtime millionaire" that he wrote about. In 1922, the Kalamazoo Gazette published an interview with Jones that said that at that time the sale of one song with its royalties and recordings could set an entertainer up for life. But in Jones' day, songs sold for $50–100 each. Had he been born later, Jones would have made a lot more money, the article said, concluding: "Jones said there is just so much melody in a person's soul, and his supply is exhausted, and he sold his songs for a song. He is too good-natured to grouch over what might have been, even though he has a perfect right to be."
