= Nadia Colburn =

American poet and non-fiction writer (born 1972)

- Born: Nadia Herman Colburn; December 5, 1972 (age 53)
- Education: Harvard University (B.A); Columbia University (PhD)
- Occupations: Writer, poet, coach, teacher
- Writing career
- Language: English
- Genre: Poetry
- Notable work: The High Shelf (2019)
- Notable awards: Pen/New England Discovery Award; Jacob K. Javits Fellowship
- Website: nadiacolburn.com

Nadia Colburn (born December 5, 1972) is an American poet, teacher, literary critic, and writing coach based in Cambridge, MA. She has published poetry and prose in a wide range of national publications and her poetry book The High Shelf was published in 2019. She was a founding editor of Anchor Magazine. Nadia Colburn is a recipient of Pen/New England Discovery Award and Jacob K. Javits Fellowship.

== Early life and education ==
Colburn grew up in New York City. She graduated magna cum laude and Phi Beta Kappa from Harvard University with a B.A. in English. She went on to get a Ph.D. in English Literature at Columbia University and has worked as a professor at Lesley, MIT, and at Stonehill College.

Colburn co-founded Anchor Magazine: The Intersection of Spirituality and Social Justice in 2013. She is the founder of the writing school Align Your Story. Her classes combine writing, mindfulness, and embodied practices. Colburn often writes about the environment, social justice, women's issues, and mindfulness. She lives in Cambridge, MA with her husband and two children.

== Writing ==
Colburn's poetry and prose have been published in Harvard Review, Midway Journal, The American Poetry Review, The New Yorker, The Southwest Review, Oxford's Literary Imagination, The Kenyon Review, Spirituality and Health, Lion's Roar, and Slate. Her essay "Listening to My Body" was included in The Anatomy of Silence: Twenty-Six Stories About All the Sh** That Gets in the Way of Speaking About Sexual Violence. She was a contributing author in The Cambridge Companion to W.H. Auden. Colburn's debut poetry book on pregnancy, nature, trauma, and love, The High Shelf, was published in 2019. She has written reviews on books and arts for Los Angeles Review of Books, Harvard Review, and Boston Review.

== Recognition ==
- Andrew W. Mellon Fellowship
- Jacob K. Javits Fellowship
- Bunner Prize for Best American Essay at Columbia University
- Pen/New England Discovery Award
