= Thanks for the Buggy Ride =

1928 film directed by William A. Seiter

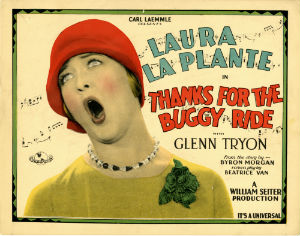
- Theatrical release poster
- Directed by: William A. Seiter
- Screenplay by: Beatrice Van; Tom Reed
- Story by: Byron Morgan
- Starring: Laura La Plante; Glenn Tryon; Richard Tucker; Kate Price; Jack Raymond; Trixie Friganza
- Cinematography: Arthur L. Todd
- Edited by: Edward M. McDermott
- Production company: Universal Pictures
- Distributed by: Universal Pictures
- Release date: April 1, 1928
- Running time: 60 minutes
- Country: United States
- Languages: Silent Version; Sound Version (Synchronized); English Intertitles

Thanks for the Buggy Ride is a 1928 American comedy film directed by William A. Seiter and written by Beatrice Van and Tom Reed. The film was first released on April 1, 1928, by Universal Pictures. Due to the public apathy towards silent films, a sound version was prepared late in 1928. While the sound version has no audible dialog, it features a synchronized musical score with sound effects using both the sound-on-disc and sound-on-film process. The film stars Laura La Plante, Glenn Tryon, Richard Tucker, Kate Price, Jack Raymond and Trixie Friganza.

== Cast ==
- Laura La Plante as Jenny
- Glenn Tryon as Joe Hall
- Richard Tucker as Mr. McBride
- Kate Price as Mrs. Crogan
- Jack Raymond as Mr. Belkoff
- Trixie Friganza as Actress
- Lee Moran as Bill Barton
- David Rollins as Harold McBride

== Music ==
The sound version of the film featured a theme song entitled "Thanks for the Buggy Ride" by Jules Buffoon.

== Reception ==
Time magazine called the movie "one more somewhat rickety vehicle for the comic daintiness of Cinemactress Laura La Plante":

It is an antiquated wagon, moving along upon wheels of device so often employed that they squeak loudly: thus, at a picnic, pigs gobble the sandwiches; when the picnickers, a young songwriter and a dancing instructress, seek nearby shelter they are embarrassingly mistaken for a married couple, which, later on, they become. Thanks for the Buggy Ride seems to be unconscious of its triteness. It has a careless, youthful, bumptious gaiety, which gives it the quality of a nutting bee, or a hayride in a Ford truck organized for the amusement of juvenile sophisticates.

== Preservation ==
With no holdings located in archives, Thanks for the Buggy Ride is considered a lost film.
