= Jacob Graves =

American architect

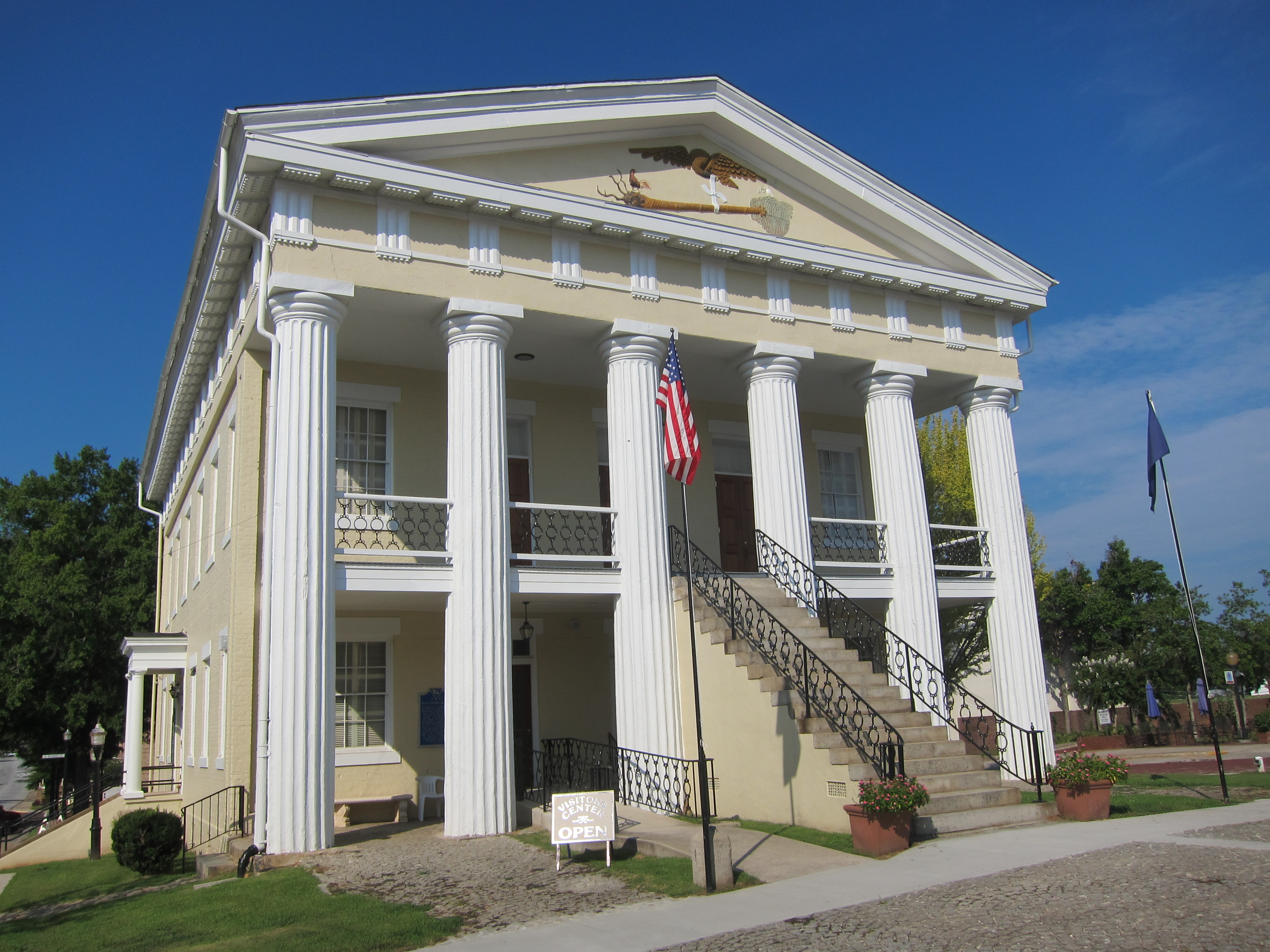
Old Courthouse (Newberry, South Carolina)

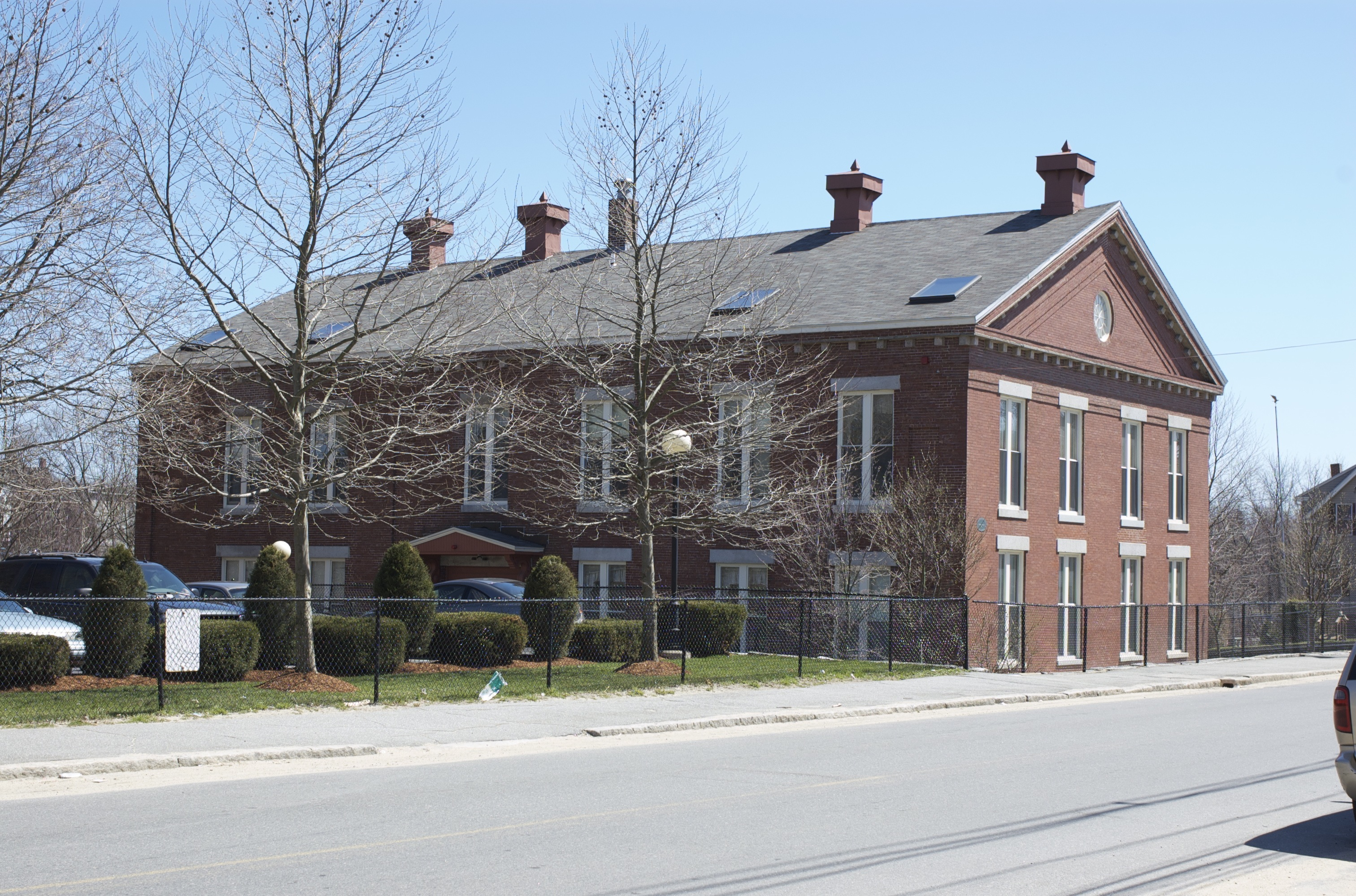
Colburn School

Jacob Graves (c. 1808 – 1856) was an American architect of Columbia, South Carolina.

Some of his works are listed on the U.S. National Register of Historic Places.

Works include:

- Concord Female College's main building, now the Mitchell College Main Building, North Carolina
- Colburn School, built in 1848, 136 Lawrence St. Lowell, Massachusetts (Graves, Jacob), NRHP-listed
- Old Courthouse, built in 1852, includes Greek Revival architecture, 1207 Caldwell St. Newberry, South Carolina (Graves, Jacob), NRHP-listed
