= Concert saloon =

American form of music hall

The concert saloon was an American adaptation of the English music hall, and a precursor of variety and vaudeville theater. As in the music hall, alcohol was served. The entertainment at the saloon was to hold the imbiber's attention so they would imbibe more.

The fact that the concert saloons featured a kind of particularly tawdry, low-end theatre as well as liquor and the new fad of "waiter girls"—and, in the minds of many, prostitution—was too much for many so-called respectable people to bear. As late as 1881, Nym Crinkle would point out, "they serve as the gathering places for idle and vicious people to drink beer, listen to execrable music, make assignations, and parade in the dirtiest market those common charms which they have to sell." [The concert saloon's] reputations continued to be bad as long as they existed.

— Brooks McNamara
