= Warren Colburn =

American mathematician

Warren Colburn (born in Dedham, Massachusetts, 1 March 1793; died in Lowell, Massachusetts, 13 September 1833) was a Massachusetts businessman, mathematician, and educator.

== Biography ==
His parents were poor, and when a boy he worked in factories in the different villages to which they moved. He learned the machinist's trade, but early manifested a taste for mathematics, and entered Harvard in 1816, from where he graduated 1820. He then opened a school in Boston.

In April 1823 he became superintendent of the Boston Manufacturing Company at Waltham, Massachusetts, and in August 1824 of the Merrimack Manufacturing Company at Lowell. In these capacities, he invented important improvements in machinery.

In the Fall of 1825, he delivered a course of lectures on the natural history of animals, illustrated with the magic lantern. This he followed in later years with further popular lectures on light, the eye, the seasons, electricity, hydraulics, astronomy, commerce, etc. These lectures continued through many years.

He was also superintendent of schools at Lowell, was elected a Fellow of the American Academy of Arts and Sciences in 1827, and was for several years an examiner in mathematics at Harvard.

== Arithmetic book ==
His reputation rests largely on his First Lessons in Intellectual Arithmetic (Boston, 1821), the plan of which he had carefully completed while yet an undergraduate at Harvard, where he was impressed by the necessity of such a work. He was accustomed to say that “the pupils who were under his tuition made his arithmetic for him,” that the questions they asked, and the necessary answers and explanations which he gave in reply, were embodied in the book. No other elementary work on arithmetic ever had such a sale. It had a large world-wide circulation, and was translated, not only into most of the languages of Europe, but also into several of the eastern tongues. He also published a “Sequel” to his arithmetic (1824; revised ed., 1833), and an “Algebra” (1827).

== Legacy ==
The Colburn School in Lowell is named after him.
