= Jeremiah Colburn =

- Born: January 12, 1815; Boston, Massachusetts, US
- Died: December 30, 1891 (aged 76)
- Occupation: numismatist
- Known for: Boston Numismatic Society
- Spouse: Eliza Ann Blackman
- Parents: Calvin Colburn (father); Caroline Sibyl Lakin (mother)

Jeremiah Colburn (January 12, 1815 – December 30, 1891) was a Boston numismatist. He also collected various other things. He lived his whole life in Boston.

== Early life ==
Jeremiah Colburn was born on January 12, 1815 in Boston, Massachusetts. His parents were Calvin Colburn and Caroline Sibyl Lakin. His grandfather served in the Continental Army.

== Career ==
He made his living first (1830) as a clerk, then as a merchant (until 1852), and eventually was appointed by President Franklin Pierce as an appraiser for the United States Customs Service (1852–1860).

He started his collecting activity with coins, and afterward turned his attention to shells, minerals, etc., and finally to books, autographs, manuscripts, portraits, and engravings relating to the United States, including continental money and the more recent issues of paper tokens. In 1840, he began a collection of bank notes. In 1857 he contributed articles to the Historical Magazine on U.S. coins and coinage, which were followed for several years by short articles on these subjects in Notes and Queries. He was one of the founders of the Boston Numismatic Society (1860), had been its curator, vice president, and president (1865–1891), and was one of the editors of the American Journal of Numismatics (1870–1891).

He founded the Prince Society (1858), was elected to the New England Historic Genealogical Society (1857), and was a founding member of the Boston Antiquarian Club (1879, later, 1881, the Bostonian Society).

== Family ==
He married Eliza Ann Blackman in 1846.

== Death ==
Colburn died on December 30, 1891 in Boston.

== Honors ==
In 2022, Colburn was posthumously inducted into the American Numismatic Association Hall of Fame in Colorado Springs.
