= Carrie W. Colburn =

American actress and playwright

Carrie W. Colburn (c. 1859 – May 23, 1932) was an American theater and silent film actress, as well as a playwright. She sometimes acted on the stage under the name Ray Harrison.

== Life and career ==
Colburn was born in 1858 or 1859 in Gardiner, Maine. Her brother was Frank S. Colburn.

She wrote plays, and skits, and acted in theatrical productions, including in Little Minister by J. M. Barrie and Over the Hill.

She wrote the three-act, comedy play His Last Chance or The Little Joker. In 1893, a performance of the play was held in Philadelphia, Pennsylvania. That year in September, the play was produced in Winthrop Centre in Massachusetts, after she was living in the area for the summer. The year after, the play was produced in Boston, with Trixie Friganza playing the lead, and Colburn playing as a character named Buttons. Later on, His Last Chance was plagiarized and republished under the name My Uncle from India and My Uncle; the plagiarized version was produced by at least four acting companies.

Colburn wrote a "society comedy" play titled Bob's Uncle, which was produced in Boston in 1894. During the performance, Colburn played the part of a boy. She wrote the war drama play, The Girl in Blue, which premiered in March 1894 at the Columbia Theater in Boston; during the performance, she played the part of a "youngster". Half of the proceeds from the production were planned to be donated to charity. After the performance at Columbia, Colburn was quoted in the Boston Globe asking for the public to "suspend judgement" until a better performance of the play was produced, stating her work wasn't represented properly.

In 1894, Colburn was the manager of the Star school of acting, based in Boston. That same year, she started a stock company that was meant to perform in suburban towns.

Once motion pictures began gaining popularity, Colbrun left stage acting to become an actress in films. She played as the parson's mother in the film, Smilin' Through, which was released in 1922.

Colburn retired from acting later in her life. At the time of her death, she was living with Sarah Bird, a retired actress and musician who previously worked in the theater. She died on May 23, 1932, at her home in Manhattan, New York City. She was buried by the Actors Fund of America. After her death, a neighbor mentioned she was sick for the week prior.

== Works ==
- Bob's Uncle (c. 1894)
- The Girl in Blue (c. 1894)
- His Last Chance; or, The Little Joker. A Comedy in Three Acts (1895) - published by W. Baker (Baker's Edition of Plays)
- Superno (c. 1897) - music composed by Fred Arundel
- A Romantic Rogue. A Comedy-Drama in One Act (c. 1902) - published by W. Baker (Baker's Edition of Plays)
