= Jacob K. Javits Fellowship =

Defunct academic support programme

The Jacob K. Javits Fellowship program formerly provided fellowships to students of superior academic ability—selected on the basis of demonstrated achievement, financial need, and exceptional promise—to undertake study at the doctoral and Master of Fine Arts level in selected fields of arts, humanities, and social sciences. The program stopped accepting applications as of fiscal year 2012.

== The Program ==
The Javits Fellowship program was highly competitive, with only 6-8% of applicants receiving funding in any given year.

The fellowship provided an institutional payment—which the fellow's institution accepts in lieu of tuition and fees—and a stipend based on the fellow's financial need as determined by the financial aid office using the student's FAFSA and the established cost of living in the area. In fiscal year 2007, the institutional payment was $12,627 and the maximum stipend was $30,000. For fiscal year 2008, the maximum stipend was $30,000, and the institutional payment was $12,891.

== Selected Fields of Study ==
=== Arts ===
Creative writing; Music Performance, Theory, Composition, and Literature; Studio Arts (including Photography); Television, Film, and Cinematography; Theater Arts, Playwriting, Screenwriting, Acting, and Dance.

=== Humanities ===
Archaeology; Area Studies; Classics; Comparative literature; English language and Literature; Folklore, Folklife; Foreign Languages and Literature; Less Commonly Taught Languages (Arabic, Chinese, Japanese, Korean, Russian, Hindi, Urdu, Sinhala, Bengali, Nepali, Punjabi, Marathi, Gujarati, Oriya, Assamese, Dari, Persian, Tajik, Kurdish, Pashto, Balochi, Turkish, Azerbaijani/Azeri, Kazakh, Kyrgyz, Turkmen, Uzbek, Uyghur, etc.); History; Linguistics; Philosophy; Religion*; Speech, Rhetoric, and Debate; and Art history.

=== Social Sciences ===
Anthropology; Communications and Media; Criminology; Economics; Ethnic and Cultural Studies; Geography; Political science; Psychology*; Public policy and Public administration; and Sociology*.

* Fellowships cannot be used for students studying for a religious vocation, or for study for a Master's degree or Ph.D. in clinical psychology or social work.

== Administration and Funding ==
The Javits Fellowship program was administered by the U.S. Department of Education and governed by laws laid out in the Higher Education Opportunity Act (Public Law 110-315). Between 40 – 70 new fellowships were issued in any given year, with $9,500,000 - $10,000,000 available to support continuing and new fellows.
