= William D. Foster =

American film producer

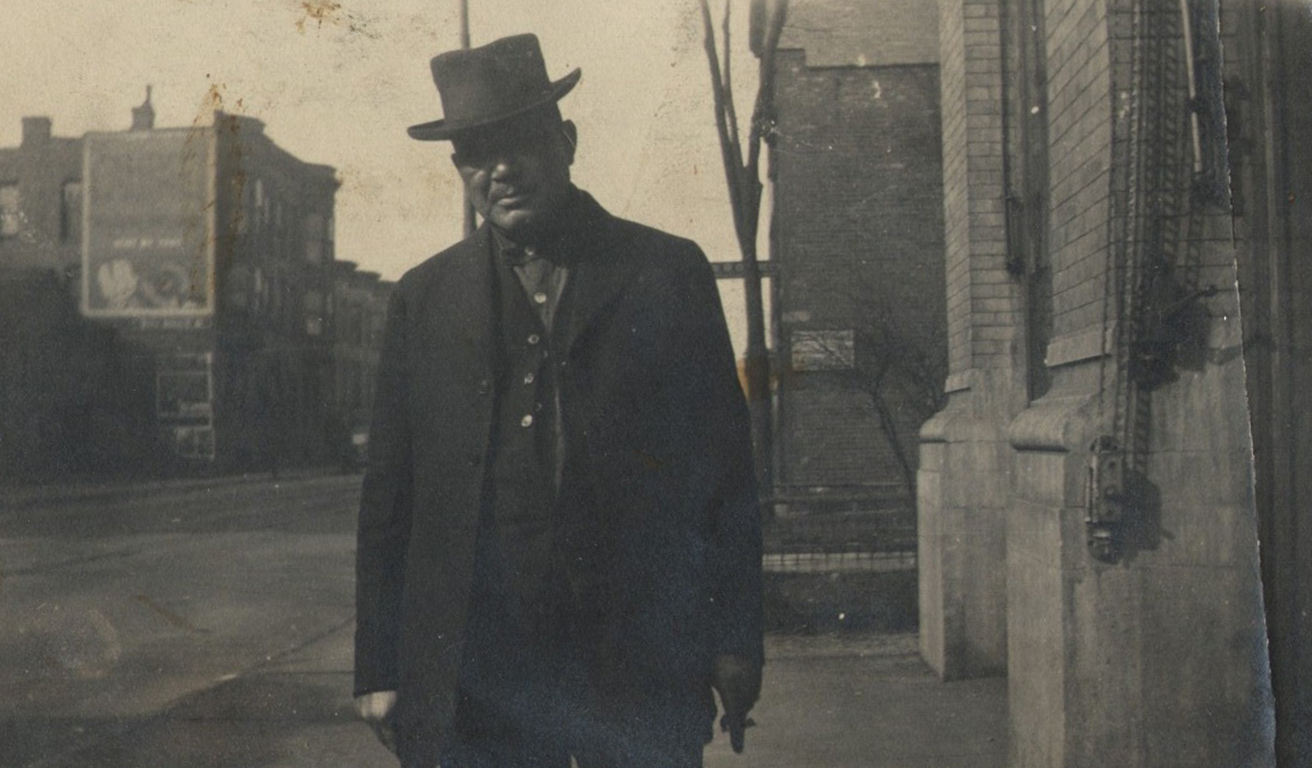
- Born: 1884; United States
- Died: 15 April 1940 (aged 55–56); United States
- Occupation: Film producer

William D. Foster, sometimes referred to as Bill Foster (1884 – 15 April 1940), was a pioneering African-American film producer who was an influential figure in the Black film industry in the early 20th century, along with others such as Oscar Micheaux. He was the first African American to found a film production company, establishing the Foster Photoplay Company in Chicago in 1910. Foster had a vision for the African-American community to portray themselves as they wanted to be seen, not as someone else depicted them. He was influenced by the black theater community and wanted to break the racial stereotyping of blacks in film. He was an actor and writer under the stage name Juli Jones, as well as an agent for numerous vaudeville stars. His film The Railroad Porter, released in 1912, is credited as being the world's first film with an entirely black cast and director. The film is also credited with being the first black newsreel, featuring images of a YMCA parade. Foster's company produced four films that were silent shorts.

== Biography ==
William Foster was born in Chicago, Illinois in 1884. He started his career as a sports writer for the Chicago Defender, a local African-American newspaper, writing under the name Juli Jones.

The Defender had recently been established in 1905 by Robert Sengstacke Abbott. By the First World War, it became the nation's "most influential Black weekly newspaper." Foster periodically wrote for other newspapers as well, still under the penname Juli Jones, including an article for the Indianapolis Freeman published in 1913, in which he "sketches out the public disclosure on the representation of blacks in white-produced films, a disclosure that would define the terms of the debate for the rest of the century". In addition to being a writer, Foster was a press agent for vaudeville stars such as Bert Williams and George Walker and also worked as a booking agent and business manager for Chicago's Pekin Theater, which at the time was a well known vaudeville house. With these connections, he had his foot in the door of the theater industry years before he started his own film company.

In 1910 he founded the Foster Photoplay Company, which is credited as the first African-American independent film company. Foster stated that the film industry "is the Negro businessman's only international chance to make money and put his race right with the world." His goal was not only business success but also to show that African Americans could improve their image and standing all over the world. From the start Foster intended to leave his mark on the film industry and make an impact on the culture of his time and the culture of the future. In the words of film critic Thomas R. Cripps, Foster was “a clever hustler from Chicago, he had been a press agent for the [Bert] Williams and [George] Walker revues and [Bob] Cole and [Billy] Johnson's A Trip to Coontown [circa 1898], a sportswriter for the [Chicago] Defender, an occasional actor under the name of Juli Jones, and finally a purveyor of sheet music and Haitian coffee. He may have made the first black movie, The Railroad Porter, an imitation of Keystone comic chases completed perhaps three years before The Birth of a Nation [February 8, 1915]."

He died in Chicago, Illinois on 15 April 1940.

== The Foster Photoplay Company ==
The movie industry was still fairly new to the media world and offered potential for all sorts of people to get involved. Foster took hold of this growing industry and quickly made his mark in it. He established the Foster Photoplay Company in 1910 and its films portrayed African Americans “in slapstick humor where a character might first slip, get his head stuck in a barrel, and then be spanked by another Black person wielding a wooden plank". Slapstick comedy, in which the humor derived from characters making a complete fool of themselves, was a comedic genre typical at the time of silent films. The Foster Photoplay Company helped set up the tradition of black comedies and also established Foster's place in the film industry. The short films he produced and directed showcased all-black casts, with a positive look on the black culture and the African-American community as a whole, with a view to correcting the negative images prevalent in Hollywood. After The Railroad Porter was released, Foster used his connections from his days working as a press agent at the Pekin Theatre to get African-American film stars to play in his short films. More black production companies started in Chicago prior to the coming of sound than in any other city. In 1914, Foster went on a tour to the south to promote his three films released in 1913: The Fall Guy, The Butler, and The Grafter and the Maid. Along with those releases, The Railroad Porter was also promoted by the leading lady, Lottie Grady, who would sing in front of the audiences while the film reels were changed between the shorts. Foster's company produced films from 1910 to 1913, but eventually folded, due to distribution problems. In 1915, the Lincoln Motion Picture Company came into being, building on Foster's groundwork to produce various films including The Realization of a Negro's Ambition in 1916 and The Trooper of Company K in 1917.

== Films ==
Four films were produced by the Foster Photoplay Company, the most notable being The Railroad Porter; produced in 1912, and Foster's most financially successful movie. The movie premiered in Chicago at the States and Grand Theater and was an instant success.

A synopsis from September 25, 1913, from the New York Age states that the film "dealt with a young wife, who thinking her husband had gone out on 'his run,' invited a fashionably dressed chap, who was a waiter at one of the colored cafes on State Street, to dine. However, the husband did not go out, and, upon returning home found wifey sitting at the table serving the waiter all the delicacies of the season. Mr. Husband proceeds to get his revolver, which he uses carelessly, running the unwelcome visitor back to his home. Then the waiter gets his revolver and returns the compliment… no one is hurt… and all ends happily." The movie was one of the first to represent blacks in a positive manner. It has also been said to be one of the first films to showcase a chase sequence.

In 1913 Foster produced three more silent shorts: The Fall Guy was another slapstick comedy like The Railroad Porter, The Butler was a detective story, and The Grafter and the Maid was Foster's only melodrama. He worked to produce comedies that would appeal to a wide range of viewers, but his use of an all-black cast, director, producer and crew was significant.

== Film before Foster ==
In the late 19th century, blacks were portrayed in white films, even sometimes as soldiers, as in Edison's films The Colored Troops Disembarking and shortly after The Ninth Negro Cavalry Watering Horses. Films such as these were stopped being produced abruptly and the comedic and degrading depiction of African Americans became dominant in the white film industry. In 1898, the film A Trip to Coontown was made by Bob Cole. It was the first musical in New York written, performed and directed by blacks, and it played on the stereotypes of minstrel theatre. This film was one of the first that showed that African Americans too could produce entertaining films about blacks, but ones that did not degrade them altogether. These films, along with those of Foster years later, showed that African Americans were starting to fight back against harmful racial stereotypes. The NAACP began to get involved in the 1910s by criticizing films such as The Nigger (1914) and The Birth of a Nation (1915) for depicting blacks in a degrading manner.

== Racial stereotypes in film ==
When Foster began making films, racial stereotypes of blacks flooded the industry. In the early 20th century, blackface was still being used to represent blacks in film. Blackface involved white actors covering their faces completely with a black substance-like make-up. The actors drew on huge, pretentious red lips to make the face even more over the top. This technique emphasized the racial stereotypes that existed and was most prominent starting in the mid-19th century. Minstrel shows showcased blackface actors at the expense of the African-American community. The shows made fun of blacks and impersonated them by making them look like buffoons and imbeciles, using stereotypical characters such as the mammy figure – a dark-skinned, large female who watched over the white children – Sambo, a young male who is lazy and always lounging around; and Uncle Tom, a docile and loved family member who works on the plantation. Early minstrelsy involved a white man painted with a blackface, but as time progressed and blacks became a part of the film world, blacks started to impersonate themselves with blackface. Minstrelsy remains a controversial issue; some see it as a racist, while others see it as tradition. It is a form of entertainment prevalent for more than one hundred years, and still exists in world culture today. Films such as Spike Lee's Bamboozled (2000), about a black television executive who decides to make a minstrel show and is appalled by its success, still convey the same stereotypes that Foster was trying to convey nearly one hundred years earlier. Foster tried to break down these stereotypes. Entering an industry that had never had much positive African-American influence before, he ignited a spark in the African-American community for decades to come.

== Race films ==
Foster was also in the forefront of race films – films that were made with an all-black cast, featuring black people and black lifestyle, for a black audience, and shown to segregated African-American viewers. The history of race films began with Foster in 1910 and the comedic shorts produced by the Foster Photoplay Company. "These independent productions provided black viewers with images of African-American experience that were conspicuously absent from Hollywood films, including black romance, urban migration, social upheaval, racial violence, alcoholism and color prejudice within the black community". The genres range from comedies and western shows, to dramas and horror flicks. These race films were among the most successful independent films due to their appeal to the African-American community. They were entertaining and provided an atmosphere entirely produced and featured by African Americans. The Foster Photoplay Company helped to introduce the idea of race films that enabled African Americans to depict their own image in the way they wanted. "Race films by maverick African-American directors such as Oscar Micheaux and Spencer Williams laid the groundwork for later black filmmaking, from the commercial successes of 1970s 'blaxploitation' films to the stylistic references and social commentary of Charles Burnett, Julie Dash and Spike Lee,” said Jacqueline Stewart, Professor in English, Cinema and Media studies, and African and African-American studies. This filmmaking and inspiration all of which started from William Foster and his few silent, short race flicks.

== The end of Foster Film ==
Once the Foster Photoplay Company went under after 1913, even with all its success, Foster relocated. At one point he even sent reels of his films overseas to the men fighting in World War I, so they could see what he was trying to do back home in the States to help the fight for racial equality. During the 1920s, he moved to Los Angeles to produce musical shorts of black entertainers for Pathe Studios, and then tried to establish a second incarnation of his film production company. However, around this same time, silent films were beginning to be overshadowed by the introduction of sound in the movie industry, and Foster's second shot at the Foster Photoplay Company went out of business before it even produced its first film.

== Legacy ==
Foster influenced many African Americans to break into the realm of film, and after his company diminished many others followed in his direction. Within a few years George Johnson opened the Lincoln Motion Picture Company; shortly afterwards, other companies such as the Ebony Film Corp. started producing race films. By the 1920s, more than thirty film production companies had been set up to produce films about blacks and their lives. The Lincoln Motion Picture Company was known for making melodramatic films that always portrayed a black hero who prevailed and raised the image of his culture and people. Films of this nature would decades later come to be known as Blaxploitation films. Nonetheless, a few decades after Foster's heyday, major motion picture corporations started to feature blacks on film. While these films were nothing like those of the independently run film corporations such as Foster's, whose focus was primarily on uplifting the black image, they represented the expansion of African-American influence in the industry that "race films" such as those produced by Foster pioneered.

== Filmography ==
- The Railroad Porter (1912)
- The Barber
- The Fall Guy
- The Butler
- The Grafter and the Maid
