= Dora Cole Norman =

- Born: Dora Cole; 1888; Georgia, U.S.
- Died: 1939 (aged 50–51)
- Children: 1
- Relatives: Bob Cole (brother); Carriebel Cole Plummer (sister); Jewel Plummer Cobb (niece)

Dora Cole Norman (1888 – 1939) was an African-American educator, dancer, theater producer, playwright and sportswoman. As a young woman she played basketball for one of the first African-American women's basketball teams, the New York Girls. She taught for the New York Public School System and was the founder-director of the Colored Players Guild at the Harlem YWCA. She collaborated with W. E. B. Dubois on the 1913 production of his historical pageant The Star of Ethiopia, and gave Paul Robeson his first acting roles in the early 1920s.

== Life ==
Dora Cole was the daughter of Robert Allen Cole Sr., a carpenter, and Isabella Thomas Weldon, an African-American couple who had settled in Athens, Georgia after emancipation and later moved to Atlanta. Her eldest brother was Bob Cole, the leading figure in black musical theatre, and all the family were given some musical education. She attended Wadleigh High School for Girls. By 1904 she had befriended W. E. B. DuBois, who inscribed a copy of The Souls of Black Folk to her.

Together with her sister Carrie, Dora Cole played basketball for the New York Girls in Harlem. The club was founded in 1909 as the female auxiliary of the Alpha Physical Culture Club, America's first all-black athletic club. In its first two seasons, 1909–10 and 1910–11, the New York Girls team won all its games in the New York-New Jersey championship, including its match against rival Spartan Girls. Dora played center, and her sister Carrie was one of the forwards. In February 1910 the team played the Jersey Girls, in the first ever recorded game between two independently organized all-Black women's basketball teams. Cole captained the side, and newspaper accounts praised her teamwork. She later married Conrad Norman (1883–1986), one of the Alpha Club's Jamaican-born founders, who acted as New York Girls head coach. Later in life she also played tennis at a high level, reaching number 6 in the 1921 American Tennis Association rankings.

Cole worked as a reader and theatrical agent in New York. In 1913 she was Director of Dancing for DuBois's historical pageant The Star of Ethiopia. Directed by Charles Burroughs, with Daisy Tapley helping with the music, the pageant involved a cast of over 300 performers. In 1919 DuBois asked if she might help reprise the pageant in Columbus, Ohio.

As Mrs. Dora Cole Norman, she taught dancing at the Music School Settlement for Colored People in Harlem, founded in 1911 by Polish-American violinist David Mannes as the Harlem equivalent of the Third Street Music School Settlement. Norman's 1914 lectures at the Music School Settlement were advertised in the New York Age.

During the First World War she helped lead the Circle For Negro War Relief, which supported the psychological welfare of African American soldiers and provided aid to them and their families. In 1915 her daughter Doretta was born.

After the war Dora Cole Norman founded the Colored Players Guild of New York, to produce original plays.

Dora Cole Norman was a friend of Paul Robeson, then an aspiring law student, and in 1920 persuaded him to act in her all-Black troupe, the Amateur Players. Robeson played the lead role in Ridgely Torrence's play Simon the Cyrenian at the Harlem YMCA. That year she also contributed a game to the inaugural volume of The Brownies Book, a magazine for children published by DuBois and A. G. Dill.

Together with DuBois and NAACP James Weldon Johnson, she served on the executive committee of America's Making, a New York exposition held in October–November 1921 to celebrate the immigrant contribution to American society.

In March 1921 she performed in support of Hampton University day school's annual gymnastic exhibition. She performed "passionate and powerful" interpretative dance to Melville Charlton's Poem Erotique, and a dance "as exquisite as capricious" to the first number of Samuel Coleridge-Taylor's Scenes from an Imaginary Ballet.

In March 1922 she convinced a reluctant Robeson to return to the stage as a Broadway lead, playing a wandering minstrel in Mary Hoyt Wiborg's debut Taboo, set on a Louisiana plantation. Though the cast was coached by Charles Gilpin, and included the English actress Margaret Wycherly, the play was weak and closed after a short run. In 1924 Norman (as Hattie) played alongside Robeson (as Jim Harris) in the opening production of Eugene O'Neill's play All God's Chillun Got Wings.

In 1926 she took a year's leave of absence from the New York Public School System to work as dramatic specialist with the Playground and Recreational Association of America. She wrote and directed Loyalty's Gift, a historical pageant play with acting and music. On 12 July 1926 an all-Black cast, including a chorus of 800 singers, performed Loyalty's Gift to a mixed-race audience of over 8,000 people as part of the Sesquicentennial Exposition in Philadelphia. She also served on the executive committee of the Fourth Pan-African Congress, held in New York City in 1927. Norman was a member of Alpha Kappa Alpha sorority.

Cole's daughter Doretta died in June 1938. Cole herself died a year later, in 1939.

== Plays ==
- The Niche. Colored Players Guild, New York.
