= Foster Photoplay Company =

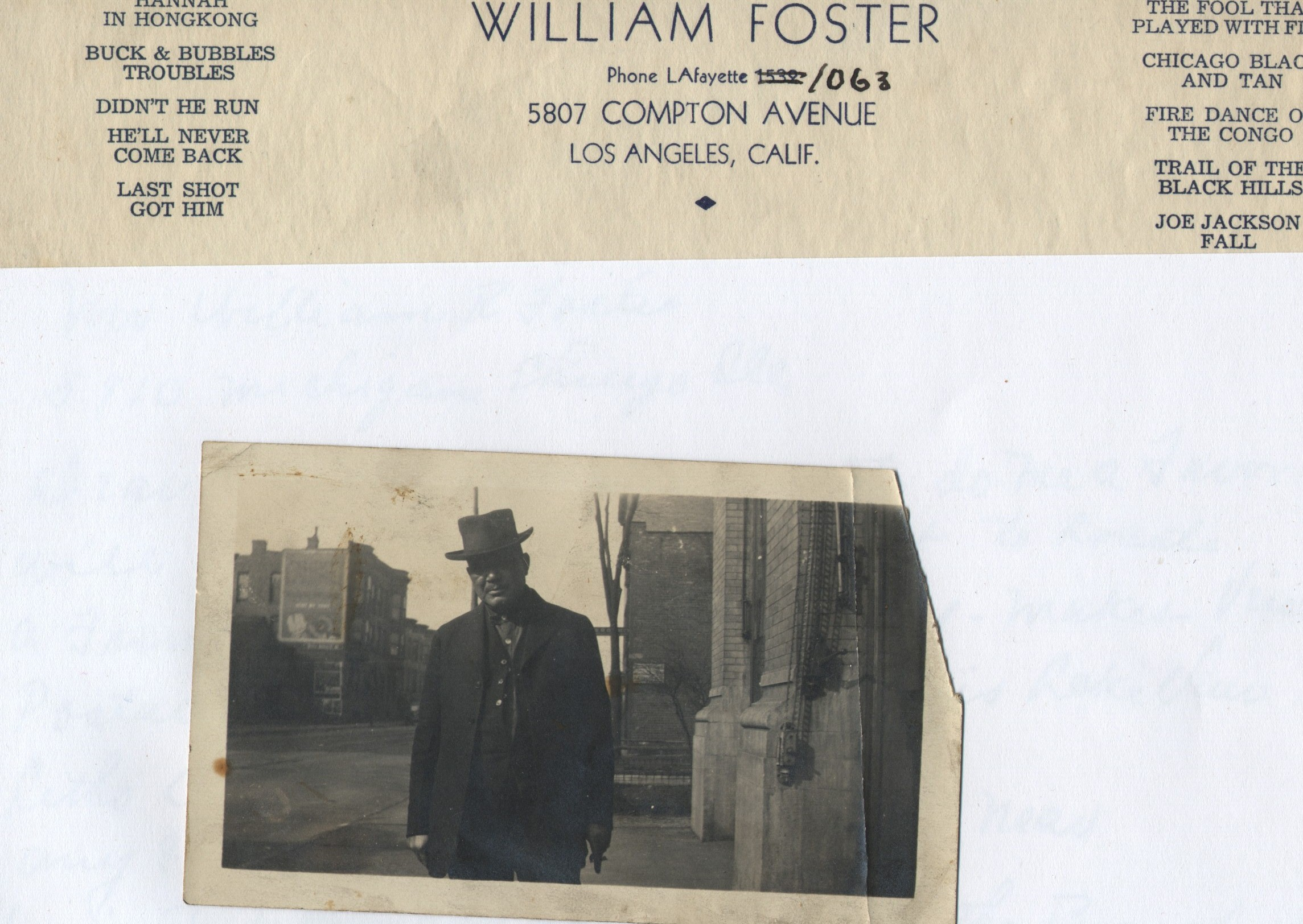
William Foster - Foster Photoplay Company

Foster Photoplay Company was a film production business in Chicago, Illinois. It was founded in 1910 by William D. Foster (also known as Juli Jones). It is widely considered to be the first film production company established by an African-American featuring all African-American casts. The company released a number of critically acclaimed films, including The Railroad Porter (1913), The Fall Guy (1913), and The Butler (1913). After the release of The Railroad Porter and The Fall Guy, the company became known for their films' slapstick-style comedy.

== Bill Foster ==
For the main article see William D. Foster

William Foster was born on September 16, 1860. He worked at a racetrack in New York as a paddock man and clocker with the well known horseman Jack McDonald and became interested in the entertainment industry as a young man. He worked as a publicity promoter for Bob Cole and Rosamond Johnson's A Trip to Coontown, a musical stage comedy performed exclusively by African Americans in New York. He continued working as a publicity promoter for Bert Williams and George Walker's In Dahomey and Abyssinia comedy productions. After getting well known in the New York theatrical circuit, Foster moved to Chicago, where he found Robert Mott's Pekin Theatre. The theater had originally been a music hall but was converted to a theater in 1904, and was known for its stock of famous writers, actors, and musicians. Foster worked for the Pekin Theater as both trusted adviser and business manager, making a point to book black vaudeville acts. Continuing his efforts to further the success of black performers, in 1909, Foster became secretary to the Goats, a group created to assist performers who were living in squalor or suffering from illness.

In 1910, Bill Foster opened the Foster Photoplay Company. He was unable to continue much farther with the company, and took on other jobs while the company was in operation. Within a year of opening the company, he became an entertainment journalist for the Indianapolis Freeman newspaper using the pseudonym "Juli Jones". Juli Jones quickly gained popularity and Foster started to write for more black newspapers across the country. As he wrote about other black performers, Foster felt his attraction to film production grow and in 1913, left his journalism career to focus on the Foster Photoplay Company. That same year, Foster produced his first film, The Railroad Porter. He continued his career in film making for 30 more years, but often found excuses to interrupt it for a fleeting hobbies.

In 1919, Foster returned to journalism, writing for Half-Century Magazine; however, Foster took a more serious tone than his music and performer reviews in the past. He wrote of the possibilities of the motion picture business and his disappointment of the African American community for failing to take advantage of the opportunities the motion picture business offered. Foster stated, "If our colored people with an interest in the race at heart, would pool their money, stop fighting each other, and get down to business, they would not only reap unlimited returns, but would do the race a great service."

By 1920, Foster found himself drowning in the film industry, unable to make a living as a movie producer. He began to sell sheet music at the William Foster Record and Roll Supply Company, and even appeared in an advertisement for Pathe Records, which helped promote the business. After the store failed, Foster bounced from job to job for years. He worked for a Haitian Coffee Company from 1925 to 1927 followed by associations with The Chicago Daily Times and The Chicago Defender, writing pieces focusing on African Americans. After quitting his job with The Chicago Defender after an apparent dispute over his friendship with a discharged employee, Foster found himself in movie business once again.

In 1929, Foster was appointed as a director for the Hollywood Pathe Corporation. He became connected with the job after he became friends with the African American doorman at Pathe. Bill Foster's first film at the Hollywood Pathe Corporation was titled Black and Tan. Black and Tan was more serious than anything Foster had created before, a movie that explored the underworld of rum runners and dope fiends. Foster's work in Hollywood was lucrative, however he yearned to return to the "race films" of his past. He began to plan the creation of a film company that would showcase high-class black films out of Santa Monica, California. Before he could establish his company, Foster died suddenly on April 9, 1940, in Los Angeles. He was 79 and was survived by his wife, Ella B. Foster.

== Inspirations ==
In the time before the Foster Photoplay Company was established, few films showed African Americans in a non-negative, or even human, fashion. Nearly all African American characters in film and on stage were over-exaggerations of well known black stereotypes, and were often white actors wearing black makeup. Because of the state of African Americans in film, there was a very minute amount of positive aspects that could have inspired William Foster to enter the film industry and create the Foster Photoplay Company. Therefore, most of the inspiration for founding the company came from anger at the way his own people were represented in plays and movies and anger at the black performers who used the negative stereotypes as the outline for the characters they played.

== Origins of the Foster Photoplay Company ==
In 1913, Foster and Joe Shoecraft purchased a small amount of film equipment in order "to supply the public with high class films in an endeavor to offset the malicious ones produced by other companies." The first event they filmed was a YMCA dedication and ball game. A few months later, Bill Foster produced the first feature created by the Foster Photoplay Company: The Railroad Porter (1913). The movie premiered at the 700 seat States Theater, one of the most prominent black theaters in Chicago's Black Belt districts. Releasing this movie was a bold choice for Bill Foster, as before then, there had not been a film that challenged the negative images that black people had obtained in cinema. For the first time in film, not only were the black people depicted on screen forced to deal with complex and critical issues, but the characters acted like human beings and not animals designed for the white public's entertainment. For this bravery and commitment to making realistic film, Bill Foster is considered a pioneer in beginning of black cinema.

Foster believed that the film industry was the most profitable market in the world, and that African Americans were doing a great disservice to themselves for not fully taking advantage of the medium, which he believed would gain the money and respect that the black community justly deserved. His disappointment towards the fellow members of his race for not realizing the power of cinema was not a secret, as he had made it clear in the hundreds of letters, papers, notes, essays, and articles he had written during his years as a filmmaker. This disappointment was sparked from a combination of his love of film and his love of his people.

== The Foster Photoplay Company in the South ==
In the year following his success with The Railroad Porter and The Fall Guy, Foster began a plan to build a movie studio in Jacksonville, Florida. It was in Jacksonville that Foster had his biggest success when the local bankers, the firm of Anderson Tucker, authorized Foster to secure a site for his studio directly in the center of the film making hub of Jacksonville. Foster wanted to move to Florida in order to gain ground against larger competitors such as Sigmund Lubin, Pathé, and others. After his streak of success in the south, Foster returned home to Chicago. Though Foster felt he had been successful in the South, the company never made the move to Jacksonville.

== Criticism ==
In 1915, Foster encouraged the manager of the Grand Theater to replace the usual vaudeville performers with motion pictures in order to save money and bring up attendance. This plan severely backfired, however, when the public showed a preference for the vaudeville performers and revenue to the Grand Theater dropped. During this time, the Grand Theater showed a racially charged film titled, Nigger (1915) which angered the viewing audience, forcing the manager to relinquish Foster of his duties at the theater. This act drew major criticism from the black press, believing that Foster had turned his back to his race in order to save money. In the eyes of the black press, it had originally appeared that Foster was interested in catering to African Americans and this act showed that he would compromise his principles for money. However, some members of the black media believed this was a demonstration of how desperate a black filmmaker could get and the extremes one must resort to in order to stay financially stable.

== The Barber ==
The Barber was released in 1916 by the Foster Photoplay Company. It was advertised as being a big action comedy picture, a first for the production company. The Barber focuses on a customer in a barbershop by the name of John Willis. John speaks loudly about wanting to find a Spanish music teacher for his wife. One of the barbers overhears John's conversation and visits the Willis household posing as a Spanish music teacher, donning a fake mustache, a white suit, and a sombrero. While at the Willis' house, the barber comes across many beautiful girls who quickly become infatuated with him. John's wife is impressed, but when John comes home and sees who his wife has chosen to be her Spanish music teacher, John recognizes the barber and kicks him out of the house. While all this is happening, the barber's friend has been following him, and when he sees how the barber fails, begins to make fun of the barber to his face. The barber then attacks his friend with his musical instrument, who then vows to take out a warrant for the arrest of the barber. The following day, John Willis's wife invites the barber back to the Willis house after John has left the city. She feels that the barber was treated unfairly and deserves a second chance. As the barber leaves his shop, he incapacitates a small boy, who then vows revenge on the barber. He quickly enacts that revenge by meeting John Willis at the train station to tell John what is happening and ruin the barber's meeting with Mrs. Willis. When John comes home, the barber quickly hides in the clothes press as Mrs. Willis tries to cover for herself and the barber. Soon after, the police join John in the search for the barber, who eventually must jump out of the clothes press when it becomes too hot for him to stand. He jumps out of the window and then is chased by John and the police to a lake, where the barber jumps in and annoys a group of fishermen.

The Barber is considered to be one of The Foster Photoplay Company's most three-dimensional films, with themes of disguise, infidelity, and advice against the vices of the inner city. The Barber is an ideal example of Foster's desire to not just entertain, but to educate the public as well.

== Foster's letter ==
In an apparent act of desperation or disillusionment, Foster sent a letter to the Lincoln Motion Picture Company in which he simply asks if it is possible for black cinema to ever be as popular in white theaters as black performers are in vaudeville. He also asks the company how they handle outside films, implying that he would like to be taken under the wing of the Lincoln Motion Picture Company and work for them as a director of "race films".

== Demise of the company ==
It is not known exactly when the Foster Photoplay Company went out of business, as it happened slowly and for many reasons. One of the central reasons that the company began to falter was Bill Foster's many distractions. Foster had many hobbies and jobs which took much of time away from making films, thus leading to the demise of the company. While Foster was producing films, he was also writing for black newspapers across the country, producing a newsreel entitled, The Colored Championship Base Ball Game, and working for the Grand Theater manager. When the stage performer Aida Overton Walker, widow of George Walker, died in October 1914, Foster made sure to pay tribute to her.

In addition to these distractions, Foster began working on a film in 1916 entitled Birth of a Race. The film had several wealthy financial backers, including Universal Pictures, Booker T. Washington's Tuskegee Circle, and Julius Rosenwald of Sears Roebuck, and took more than two years to develop. I was finally released in 1918.

Despite all of Foster's hard work and the amount of money invested, the film was a financial failure. The failure of Birth of a Race caused the company to go deep into debt, adding to the pressures the company felt. Birth of a Race as well as Foster's inability to keep his focus on the company alone brought about the death of The Foster Photoplay Company.

== Filmography ==
- The Railroad Porter / The Pullman Porter (1913)
- The Butler (1913)
- The Grafter and the Girl (1913)
- Mother (1914)
- Brother (191?)
- Birthmark (191?)
- Fool and Fire (191?)
- A Woman's Worst Enemy (191?)
- The Barber (1916)
- Birth of a Race (1918)
