= Howard Kelly (actor) =

American vaudeville and film actor

Howard Kelly was an American vaudeville and film actor. He was part of the Pekin Theatre’s stock company. He started in some of William D. Foster’s Foster Photoplay Company films including The Railroad Porter and The Barber.

Kelly had a starring role in The Railroad Porter, and also starred in The Barber with Anna Holt and Edgar Lillison.

He starred with Bessie Brown in Billy King's musical Now I'm a Mason at the Grand Theatre in Chicago in 1914. Kelly also starred with Brown in King's The Night Raid at the Grand Theatre in Chicago in 1918.

== Theater ==
- In the Jungle (1915), a musical comedy by Billy King staged at the Grand Theatre
- In Society (1915), a Billy King production at the Grand Theatre

== Filmography ==
- The Railroad Porter (1912)
- The Barber (1916)
