= Joe Jordan (musician) =

American ragtime composer and songwriter (1882–1971)

- Born: Joseph Taylor Jordan; February 11, 1882; Cincinnati, Ohio, U.S.
- Died: September 11, 1971 (aged 89) Tacoma, Washington, U.S.
- Genres: Jazz, ragtime
- Instrument: Piano

Joseph Taylor Jordan (February 11, 1882 – September 11, 1971) was an American pianist, composer, real estate investor, and music publisher. He wrote over 2000 songs and arranged for notable people such as Florenz Ziegfeld, Orson Welles, Louis Armstrong, Eddie Duchin, Benny Goodman, and others.

== Early life and education ==
Jordan was born on February 11, 1882, in Cincinnati, Ohio. He grew up in St. Louis, Missouri, and received musical training at the Lincoln Institute (now Lincoln University) in Jefferson City, Missouri.

== Career ==
In 1900, Jordan performed as fiddler and percussionist with the Taborian Band of St. Louis. He also appeared with Tom Turpin, Sam Patterson, and Louis Chauvin in a singing four piano act. In 1902, he went to New York City to collaborate with Ernest Hogan, known in show business as "The Unbleached American".

At the beginning of the 20th century, much of the entertainment industry was founded upon the exploitation of ethnic stereotypes. Hogan's big hit was called "All Coons Look Alike to Me", and the stage show that he and Jordan cooked up was "Rufus Rastus". Another example of the prevalent racial thematic was "Dandy Coon", created by Chauvin and Patterson in 1903. Jordan stage-managed and directed the music for this bit of minstrelsy, which toured with a cast of thirty including a "beautiful octoroon chorus".

When the show disbanded in Des Moines, Iowa, Jordan left for Chicago. He began performing at the Pekin, a former casino/saloon at 27th and State that had been converted into a beer garden by Robert T. Motts. This location became the "Pekin Theater Stock Company" featuring many African American performers.

=== The "Pekin Theater Stock Company" ===
Jordan commemorated this hot spot with the "Pekin Rag", published in 1904. He briefly returned to St. Louis in order to play the Faust Restaurant at the 1904 St. Louis World's Fair. Now known as an expert at rapid orchestration on demand, Jordan returned to New York in 1905 to work with Ernest Hogan and James Reese Europe at organizing and directing the Memphis Students, a group of seventeen African-American men and women who were not students, nor were they from Memphis. In the spring of 1905, they premiered at Proctor's 23rd Street Theater.

James Weldon Johnson said that this "playing-singing-dancing orchestra" was "the first modern jazz band ever heard on a New York stage". Instrumentally, the ensemble contained saxophones, brass, banjos, guitars, mandolins, piano and drums. Later in 1905, they played Paris, London, and other major European cities. Jordan composed "Rise and Shine", "Oh, Liza Lady", "Goin' To Exit", and "Dixie Land" for this group. He also wrote the "J.J.J. Rag".

Back in Chicago, Motts' establishment was developing into an all-purpose entertainment center, known locally as the Pekin Temple of Music. In 1906 Motts expanded his operation by erecting the Pekin Theatre right on top of the existing "Temple". With the opening of the enlarged Pekin (one of America's first African-American-owned theatres) on March 31, 1906, the South Side of Chicago began to transform itself into a launching pad for the jazz explosion of 1915-1925. Jordan conducted the 16-piece house orchestra and served as composer and musical director, all for a weekly salary of $25.

In New York, Jordan wrote a couple of songs for Ada Overton Walker, first "Salome's Dance" and then in 1909 "That Teasin' Rag". Its main theme was used by The Original Dixieland Jazz Band on their 1917 recording the "Original Dixieland One Step". When Jordan heard the record, he filed suit. All copies of the records were recalled, and the label was changed to include the phrase "introducing ‘That Teasin' Rag' by Joe Jordan".

=== The Red Moon with Cole and Johnson ===
Also in 1909, Jordan collaborated with Bob Cole and J. Rosamond Johnson on The Red Moon, a Broadway operetta which broke Jim Crow convention by having persons of color perform serious romantic songs, expressing realistic human emotion. This was something apparently not permitted, especially outside of New York City. In 1910, Jordan wrote "Lovie Joe" (no) for Fanny Brice. Barred as a black man from entering the theater where Brice premiered the song, Jordan was forced to stand outside on the pavement and heard the public demanding eight encores.

=== European Tours and Keep Shufflin' ===
Jordan went to Germany in 1910 with King and Bailey's Chocolate Drops. On his way back he performed his way through England. Landing at the Pekin in Chicago once again, he resumed his duties there for about three years. His songs dating from this period include "Dat's Ma Honey Sho's Yo' Born", "Oh Say Wouldn't It Be a Dream" and "Brother-In-Law Dan". He did very well in Chicago's real estate market. In 1917, he built the J. Jordan Building Bronzeville neighborhood at 3529–49 South State Street, at the corner of 36th Street – described as the city's first major commercial building by a black developer. In 1918-19, he was assistant director and financial advisor for Will Marion Cook's New York Syncopated Orchestra.

In 1928, Jordan conducted a band made up of Jabbo Smith, Garvin Bushell, James P. Johnson, and Thomas "Fats" Waller in the musical revue Keep Shufflin'. Jordan's touring band was called the Ten Sharps and Flats. He conducted the Federal Theatre Project's Negro Unit Orchestra in New York during the 1930s. From April 14 to June 20, 1936, Jordan worked with Johnson, Porter Grainger, and Asadata Dafora providing music for the Federal Theatre Project production of Shakespeare's Macbeth directed by Orson Welles at the New Lafayette Theatre. In 1939, Jordan led a symphony orchestra augmented by a 350-voice chorus at Carnegie Hall.

He composed songs in collaboration with W. C. Handy, led military bands during World War II and ran a successful real estate business in Tacoma, Washington, where he died on September 11, 1971.

=== Nappy Lee ===
Nappy Lee was a nickname for a low brass player that sported unkempt albeit likable hair who once performed with Wilbur Sweatman's Orchestra. Jordan composed in 1904 a song titled "Nappy Lee", a slow drag, for mandolin orchestra (Note: Vol. 40, Second Quarter 1904, Whole No. 666 (1904), p. 145, "Nappy Lee," a slow drag © 28 March 1904; C67561; 2 c. 22 January 1904 — for orchestra; C67560; 28 March 1904; 2 c. 22 January 1904) in commemoration of Nappy Lee. However, Jordan sold it to a Des Moines publisher, J.E. Agnew (Joseph Erskine Agnew; 1868–1949). "Nappy Lee," recorded December 15, 1903, was Jordan's first recording of a rag.

== Death ==
Jordan died in Tacoma, Washington, on September 11, 1971.

== See also ==
- African American music
- African American musical theater
