= Harold West =

Harold West may refer to:

- Harold West (rower), British rower
- Harold Dadford West (1904–1974), American biochemist
- Doc West (Harold West, 1915–1951), American jazz drummer
- Harold West (golfer)
- Sir Harold West, dean of Loughborough University 1952–1957
