= Jane C. Wright =

American cancer researcher

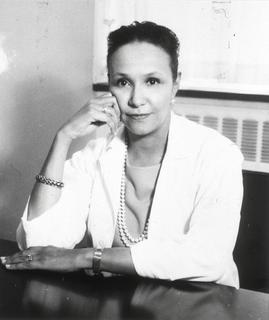
- Born: November 30, 1919; Manhattan, New York City, US
- Died: February 19, 2013 (aged 93); Guttenberg, New Jersey, US
- Education: Smith College; New York Medical College
- Known for: Development of chemotherapies; Co-founder of the American Society of Clinical Oncology
- Scientific career
- Fields: Oncology
- Workplaces: Harlem Hospital Cancer Research Center; New York University; New York Medical College

Jane Cooke Wright (November 30, 1919 – February 19, 2013), also known as Jane Jones, was a pioneering cancer researcher and surgeon noted for her contributions to chemotherapy. In particular, Wright is credited with developing the technique of using human tissue culture rather than laboratory mice to test the effects of potential drugs on cancer cells. She also pioneered the use of the drug methotrexate to treat breast cancer and skin cancer (mycosis fungoids).

== Early life, family, and education ==
Wright's family had a strong history of academic achievement in medicine. She was born in 1919 in Manhattan, New York, to Corinne Cooke, a public school teacher, and Louis T. Wright, who was one of the first African American graduates from Harvard Medical School. He was the first African American doctor at a public hospital in New York City. During his 30 years working at the Harlem Hospital, he founded and directed the Harlem Hospital Cancer Research Foundation. Louis T. Wright's biological father, Dr. Ceah Ketcham Wright, who was born into slavery but graduated from medical school, before dying when Louis T. Wright was four years old. Louis T. Wright's stepfather was William F. Penn, the first African-American graduate of Yale Medical College. Jane Wright's uncle, Harold Dadford West, was also a physician, who ultimately became the president of Meharry Medical College.

As a child, Wright attended the Ethical Culture Fieldston School, then the "Ethical Culture" school and the "Fieldston School", from which she graduated in 1938. During her time at the Fieldston School, Wright was very involved in extracurricular activities. She served as the school's yearbook art editor and was named the captain of the swim team. Her favorite subjects to study were math and science. After attending the Fieldston School, Wright received a scholarship to Smith College, where she furthered her studies and continued to be very involved in extracurricular activities. She swam on the varsity swim team, discovered a passion for the German language, and lived in the school's German house for a while. Wright graduated with an art degree from Smith College in 1942. After her time at Smith, Wright received another scholarship, to attend the New York Medical College. She graduated as a part of an accelerated three-year program at the top of her class in 1945 with the honors award.

== Professional career ==
After medical school, Wright completed residencies at Bellevue Hospital (1945–46) and later at Harlem Hospital (1947–48), where she became the chief resident. In 1949 she joined her father in research at the Harlem Hospital Cancer Research Center, which he had founded, and she ultimately succeeded him as director when he died in 1952.

In 1949, Dr. Wright joined her father at the Cancer Research Foundation at Harlem Hospital. During her time at the research institute, she and her father sparked an interest in chemotherapeutic agents. They were interested in making chemotherapy more accessible for everyone. In the 1940s chemotherapy was a new development, so it was not a well-known or well-practiced source for treatment because it was still in its experimental stage of drug development. Chemotherapy was considered the “last resort” and the drugs available and dosage was not very well defined. Both Jane and her father wanted to make chemotherapy a more accessible method of cancer treatment. They were the first groups to report the use of nitrogen mustard agents and folic acid antagonists as cancer treatments. The Folic acid antagonist can block folic acid in the body, which is required for cells to produce certain types of amino acids. By inhibiting the folic acids, cells are unable to make new strands of DNA/RNA or produce proteins to drive mitosis. Because cancer cells are highly proliferative compared to the other class in the human body, it is crucial to stop mitosis from happening. The folic acid antagonists that were tested were probably the most important discovery because the antifolates are highly potent against a vast array of solid tumors, including several types of leukemia, Hodgkin's disease, lymphosarcoma, melanoma, breast cancer, and prostate cancer. Methotrexate is still one of the main chemotherapy drugs used today to treat many types of cancer, and it has been a basis for all modern chemotherapy.

Wright's research work involved studying the effects of various drugs on tumors. In 1951 with the help of her team she was the first to identify methotrexate, one of the foundational chemotherapy drugs, as an effective tool against cancerous tumors. Wright's early work brought chemotherapy out of the realm of an untested, experimental hypothetical treatment, into the realm of tested, proven effective cancer therapeutics—thus literally saving millions of lives. Her work with this form of chemotherapy proved to be the stepping stone for combination therapy as well as the individual adjustments due to patient toxicity. In their initial research they took each patient’s tumor which was then evaluated and then grown again in tissue culture. These tumors were then treated with the same drug that was used in the treatment of the patient before the tumor was extracted. The clinical criteria needed for the evaluation of the chemotherapeutic agents to work is seen in Figure 1. With her research in tissue culture, she looked at how patients responded compared to how the tissue responded. This is fundamental as it gave a visual representation of how the medicine worked.

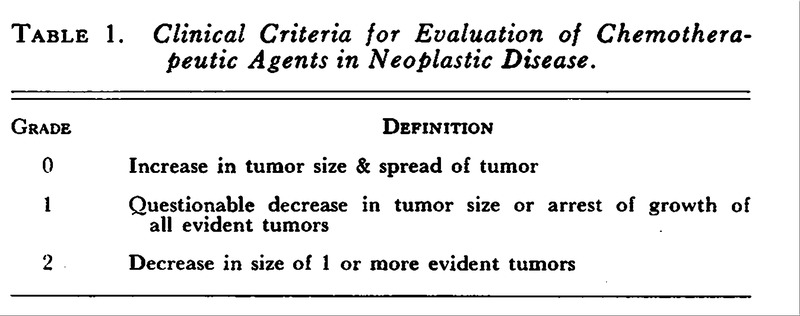
Clinical Criteria for Evaluation of Chemotherapeutic agents

In the end they determined that there was indeed a correlation between the chemotherapeutic agent given to the patient and those grown in tissue cultures. From this she was able to develop the drug methotrexate in order to fight those tumors. Wright and her father introduced nitrogen mustard agents, similar to the mustard gas compounds used in World War I, that were successful in treating the cancerous cells of leukemia patients. Wright later pioneered combinatorial work in chemotherapeutics, focusing not simply on administering multiple drugs, but sequential and dosage variations to increase the effectiveness of chemotherapy and minimize side effects. In addition to the multi-drug combination regimens, she matched drugs/drug regimens to certain tumour types in leukemia and lymphoma patients. She was successful in identifying treatments for both breast and skin cancer, developing a chemotherapy protocol that increased skin cancer patient lifespans up to ten years. She also developed a non-surgical method, using a catheter system, to deliver potent drugs to tumors located deep within the body such as the liver and spleen. She published more than 100 papers on cancer chemotherapeutics during her career and served on the editorial board of the Journal of the National Medical Association.

In 1955 she accepted a research appointment at the New York University Bellevue Medical Center, as Associate Professor of Surgical Research and Director of Cancer Research. In addition to research and clinical work, Wright was professionally active. In 1964, she was the only woman among seven physicians who helped to found the American Society of Clinical Oncology, and in 1971, she was the first woman elected president of the New York Cancer Society. Wright was appointed associate dean and head of the Cancer Chemotherapy Department at New York Medical College in 1967, apparently the highest-ranked African American physician at a prominent medical college at the time, and certainly the highest-ranked African American woman physician. She was appointed to the National Cancer Advisory Board (also known as the National Cancer Advisory Council) by US President Lyndon Johnson, serving from 1966 to 1970. and the President's Commission on Heart Disease, Cancer, and Stroke (1964–65). Wright was also internationally active, leading delegations of oncologists to China and the Soviet Union, and countries in Africa and Eastern Europe. She worked in Ghana in 1957 and in Kenya in 1961, treating cancer patients. From 1973 to 1984 she served as vice president of the African Research and Medical Foundation.

During her career, Cooke also collaborated with cell biologist and physiologist Jewel Plummer Cobb, another noted African American female scientist. Wright was the recipient of many awards, including an honorary Doctor of Medical Sciences degree from the Women's Medical College of Pennsylvania. Wright retired in 1985 and was appointed emerita professor at New York Medical College in 1987. Wright opened the world of evidence based chemotherapy and showed how it was actually effective in helping treat cancer. In describing her pioneering research in chemotherapy, she told reporter Fern Eckman, "There's lots of fun in exploring the unknown. There's no greater thrill than in having an experiment turn out in such a way that you make a positive contribution."

== Personal life ==
On July 27, 1947, Wright married David D. Jones and the couple had two daughters: Jane Wright Jones and Alison Jones. Her husband was an attorney and became founder of anti-poverty and job training organizations for young African Americans. Unfortunately, in 1976, Mr. Jones died of heart failure. Wright's daughters also grew up to work in the medical field, one becoming a psychiatrist and the other a clinical psychologist.

In addition to her love of the sciences, Jane had other hobbies she enjoyed such as art and swimming, which she had grown to love during her high school and college years. Family was also very important to her. Upon receiving the Merit Award from Mademoiselle in 1952, she stated, "My plans for the future are to continue seeking a cure for cancer, to be a good mother to my children, and a good wife to my husband."

In 1980, when the famous Rubik's Cube came out, Wright immediately bought one and learned how to solve it. She was passionate about puzzles and learning how to solve them, including puzzles found in medicine (specifically the treatment of cancer). She realized that she lived in a world where men dominated the medical field, but she did not care - she was eager to make contributions to medicine, specifically to the treatment of cancer, and did not let her gender hold her back. Additionally, she lived during a time where black pride was a huge movement, and, being an African American woman, was cognizant of her place in history. Wright was said to be very modest and tender with her patients, while still being very motivated and fearless in their care. If another physician did not have the time or inclination to look into other treatments that might benefit their patient more, Wright would always try.

After Wright retired from her work in 1987, she spent the rest of her life partaking in activities she enjoyed, such as sailing, watercoloring, and reading mysteries. Wright died on February 19, 2013, in Guttenberg, New Jersey, at 93 years old. Her two daughters survive her. Her sister, Barbara Wright Pierce, a.k.a. Dr. Barbara Penn Wright and Mrs. Samuel R. Pierce, Jr. died in her sleep in her Manhattan, NY home on Saturday, November 24, 2018, at the age 94.

== Selected publications ==
Notable research papers

- J. C. Wright, J. P. Cobb, S. L. Gumport, F. M. Golomb, and D. Safadi, "Investigation of the Relationship Between Clinical and Tissue Response to Chemotherapeutic Agents on Human Cancer", New England Journal of Medicine 257 (1957): 1207-1211.
- J. C. Wright, J. I. Plummer, R. S. Coidan, and L. T. Wright, "The in Vivo and in Vitro Effects of Chemotherapeutic Agents on Human Neoplastic Diseases", The Harlem Hospital Bulletin 6 (1953): 58-63.

Selected review articles

- Jane C. Wright, "Cancer Chemotherapy: Past, Present, and Future -- Part I.", Journal of the National Medical Association, v.76, n.8, pp. 773–784 (1984).

== Awards ==
- "Merit Award" from Mademoiselle Magazine (1952) for evaluating the efficacy of chemotherapy
- Damon Runyon Award (1953)
- Elected to membership in Sigma Xi (1962)
- "Spirit of Achievement Award", from Albert Einstein College of Medicine (1965)
- New York City's Harriet Beecher Stowe Junior High, the women's division of the Albert Einstein College of Medicine (1965)
- Links (1965)
- Honorary Doctor of Medical Sciences degree by the Women's Medical College of Pennsylvania (1965)
- Hadassah Myrtle Wreath Award (1967)
- Smith Medal from Smith College (1968)
- American Association for Cancer Research Award (1975)
- Otelia Cromwell Award from Smith College (1981)

Recognitions

- Named Award: "Jane C. Wright, MD, Young Investigator Award", created in 2011 by American Society of Clinical Oncology and the Conquer Cancer Foundation
- Named Lecture: "Minorities in Cancer Research Jane Cooke Wright Lectureship", from the American Association for Cancer Research, "given to an outstanding scientist who has made meritorious contributions to the field of cancer research and who has, through leadership or by example, furthered the advancement of minority investigators in cancer research."
- Mentioned in a 2014 episode of Rizzoli and Isles.
