= Edna Alexander =

Edna Alexander may refer to:

- Edna Alexander (composer) (1892–1972), American soprano singer and music composer
- Edna Alexander (singer) (died 1913), Canadian-born soprano based in the United States and later Europe
