= Howard Kelly =

Howard Kelly may refer to:

- Howard Kelly (Royal Navy officer) (1873–1952), Royal Navy admiral
- Howard Atwood Kelly (1858–1943), American gynecologist
  - SS Howard A. Kelly, an American Liberty ship
- Howard Kelly (actor), American actor
