= Jerry Mills (performer) =

American performer

Jerry Mills was a performer at the Pekin Theatre in Chicago. and in films.

One of his stage performances was described as offering "ludicrous comedy" and "remarkable eccentric dancing".

== Theater ==
- The Merry Widower (1908)

== Filmography ==
- The Railroad Porter
- The Grafter and the Girl (1913)
