= Joseph Byron Totten =

American playwright and theater actor

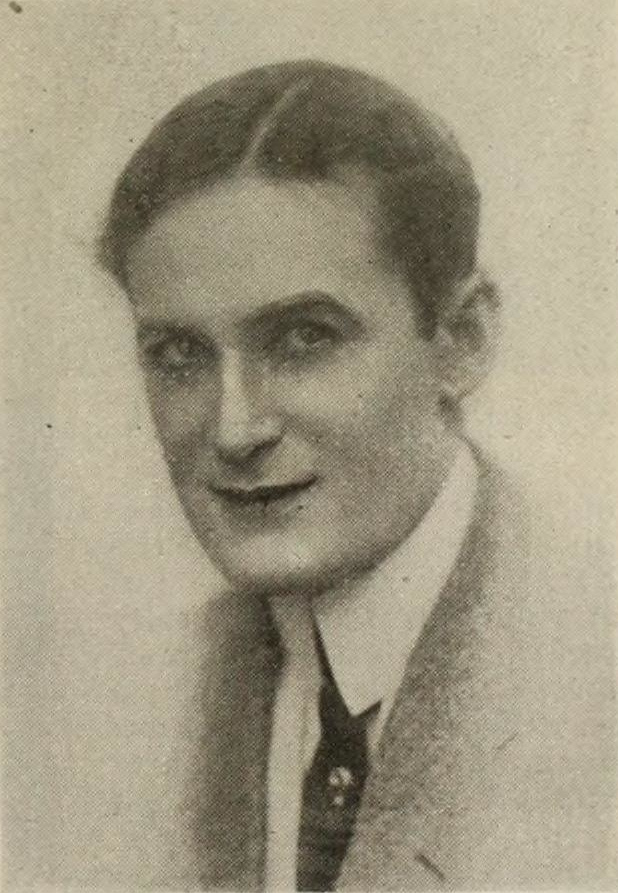
Joseph Byron Totten

Joseph Byron Totten (June 1, 1875 – April 29, 1946) was an American playwright, actor, and director.

He was an actor for Essanay. He had a 47-acre farm in Pendleton Hill, Connecticut where he kept horses, cattle, and a kennel.

He wrote No Gold Could Buy Her, No One Pity Her, The Cowboy and the Squaw, The Ranchman's Daughter, The Queen of the Cowboys, and The First Lady in the Land, both copyrighted in 1907. He wrote the play Spook House. He wrote The Forger, "a society problem play", copyrightednin 1908. He wrote and directed Lighthouse by the Sea, copyrighted in 1915. He also copyrighted the 3-reel, 3-act, The Boys Will Be Boys in 1915.

He wrote the play The World and a Woman.

He wrote a dramatization of Harold McGrath's novel The Woman Armsan. It was staged in 1915. He wrote and staged Love's Call. He was described as having a "primitive passion for triplicate nomenclature".

He wrote the words to the song "Piquita" with music by Arthur Bergh, copyrighted in 1925.

In 1917 he starred in Some Crooks.

In 1925, Charles Sidney Gilpin starred in his play So That's That.

He was a member of the Authors League of America.

== Filmography ==
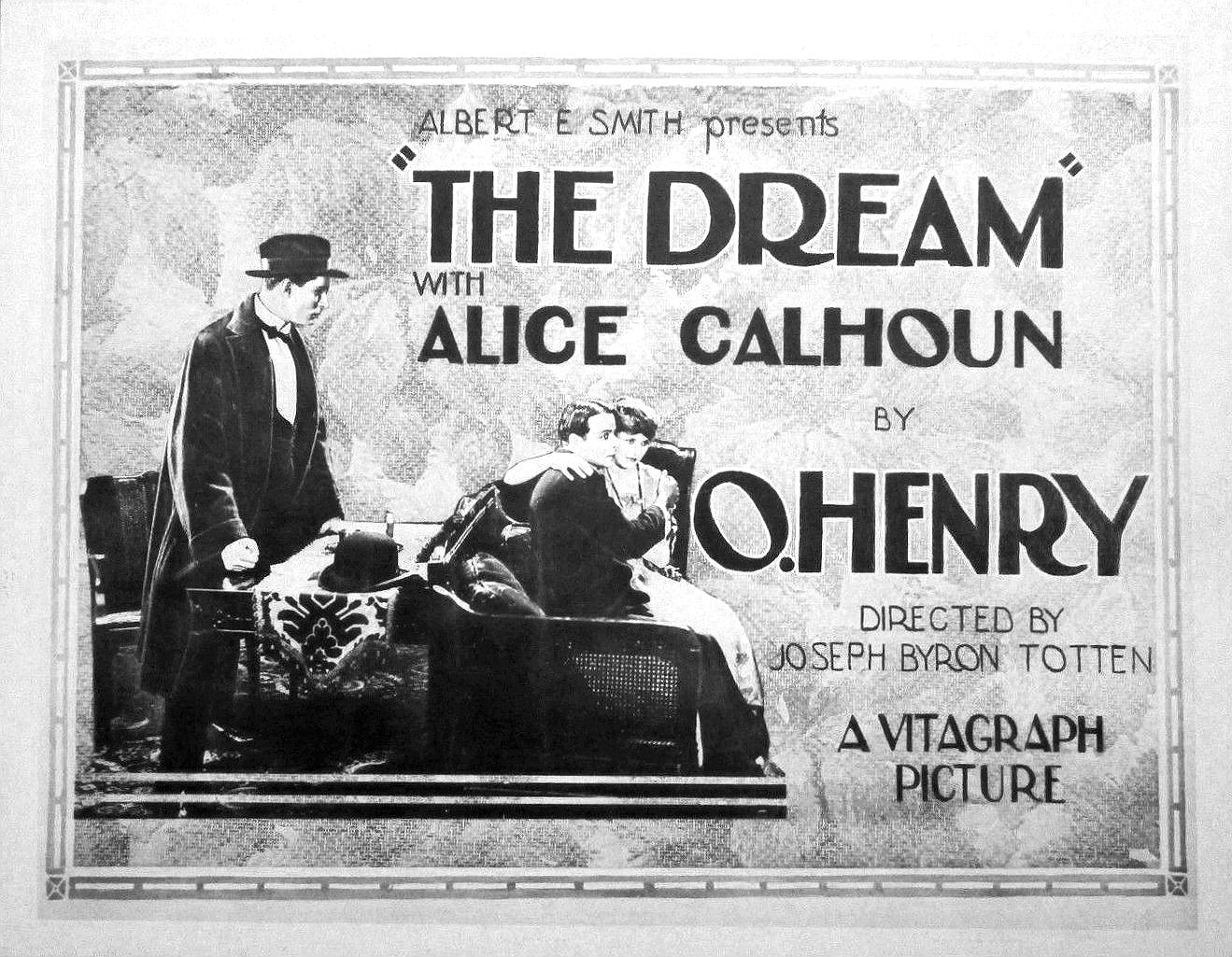
Lobby card for The Dream, a Vitagraph short atarring Alice Calhoun

- The Amateur Prodigal (1915) as John Life
- The Blindness of Virtue (1915), director
- The Awakening Hour (1915), starring role
- The Village Homestead (1915), author
- Like Father Like Son (1916)
- The Day Resurgent (1920), director
- The Dream (1920), director, starring Alice Calhoun
- While the Auto Waits (1920), director
