= The Star of Ethiopia =

1911 American historical pageant written by W. E. B. Du Bois

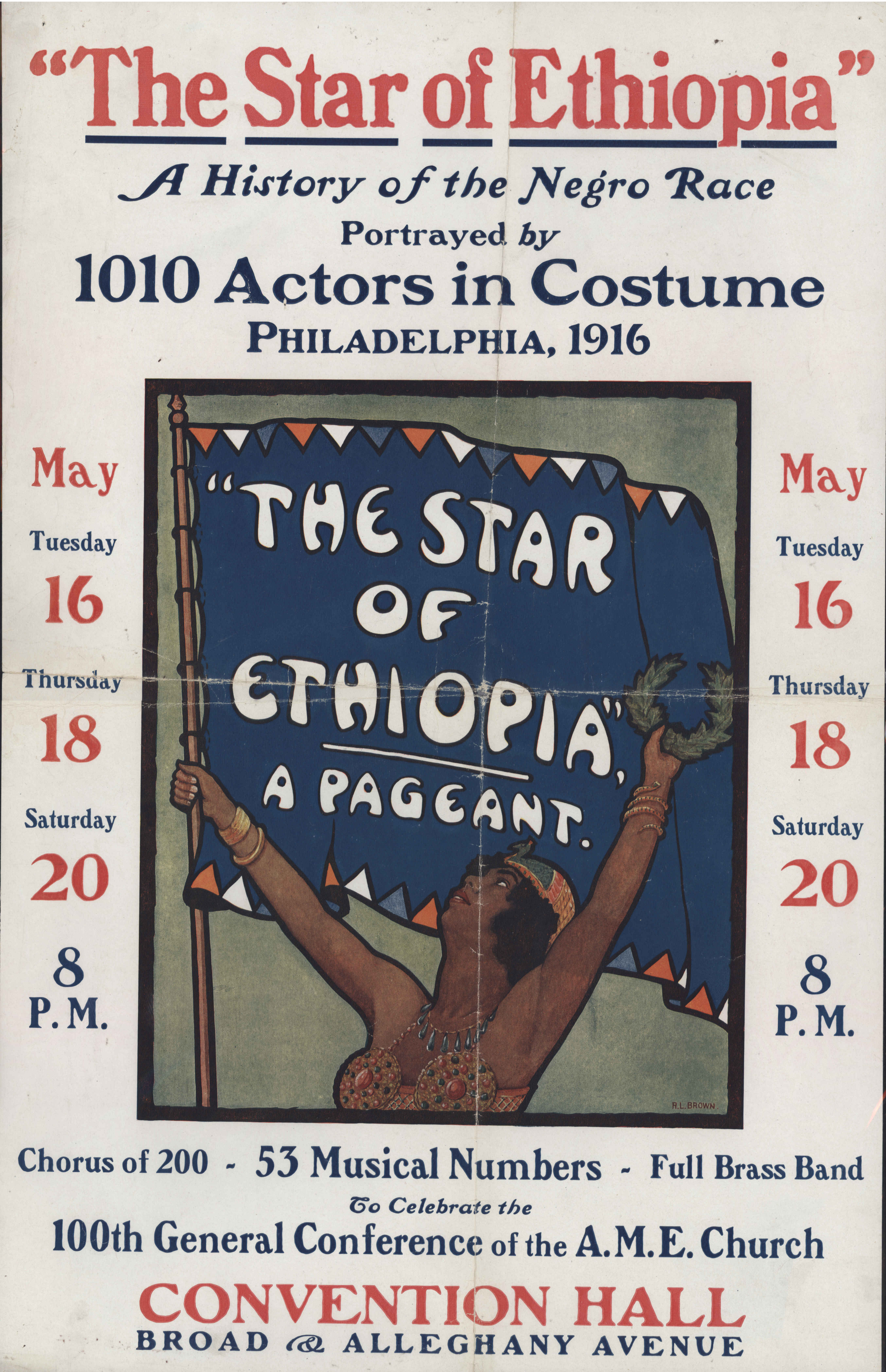
1916 Philadelphia performance

The Star of Ethiopia is an American historical pageant written by leading New Negro intellectual W. E. B. Du Bois in 1911. Outlining the history of African Americans throughout time, pageants were held in high regard by Du Bois who felt that Pageants could be utilized best as a form of educational theatre, or as an instructional tool to not only teach African Americans the meaning of their history, but also enlighten whites as to "reveal the negro...as human." Despite his minimal experience in playwriting, Pageant Movement intellectual Du Bois composed and constructed for the stage The Star of Ethiopia to be presented as an American historical pageant.

Serving as Director of Dramatic Action was Charles Burroughs; Mrs. Dora Cole Norman served as the Director of Dancing, with Richard Brown and Lenwood Morris as set decorators, including Mr. Augustus Granville Dill and J. Rosamond Johnson as Directors of Music. Experiencing critical and artistic success, The Star of Ethiopia opening performance held in New York City on October 22, 1913, was deemed "an impressive spectacle…both from a historical point of view and as a forecast. by The Outlook (New York) The performance held in Washington (1915), also had a well-received review being called "A remarkable spectacle of great educational value" by the Washington Board of Education President." DuBois would write in The Crisis that the Philadelphia (1916) performance was "technically the best", with a writer from the Public Ledger stating "The intelligent interpretation which the thousand actors in the pageant gave of the authors thought was proof in itself that the Negros not the mentally torpid individual that prejudiced white folks persist in considering him." Altogether, the three productions of The Star of Ethiopia would amass nearly 35,000 audience members in total. The Star of Ethiopia was designed to appeal to mass audiences and was a large-scale presentation structured as a prologue and five scenes:

1. The Gift of Iron, begins with the prehistoric black men who gave to the world the gift of his own invention the welding iron.
2. The Dream of Egypt, depicts Ethiopia, as the Mother of Men, then leads the mystic procession of historic events past the glory of ancient Egypt, showcasing Africa as the center of art and commerce with the splendid kingdoms of the Sudan and Zymbabwe [sic]
3. The Glory of Egypt, the evolution of human conflict
4. The Valley of Humiliation, Diaspora and the tragedy of the American slave trade with the resistance to oppression.
5. The Vision Everlasting highlighting AfricanAmericans in various professional roles Up from slavery slowly ... the black race writhes back to life and hope... on which the Star of Ethiopia gleams forever.

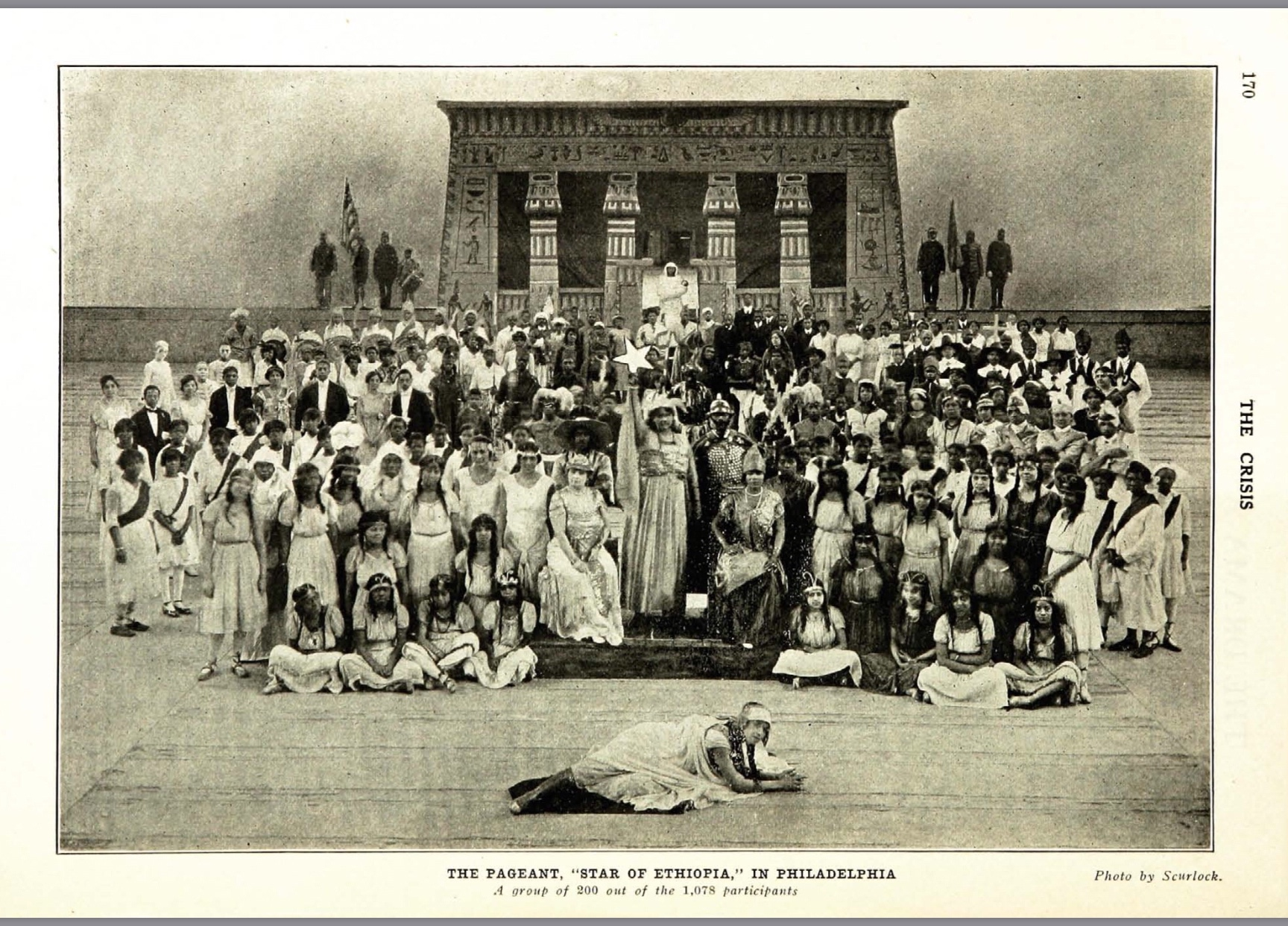
"A group of 200 out of the 1,078 participants", Philadelphia, 1916

Referencing the arts for African Americans, DuBois would write: "This is the dawn of the day for the colored playwright and the colored actor…but we must all be ready to foster and appreciate everything that can give us an entrance into the world beautiful of art." . Du Bois wrote and composed all musical selections with the assistance of J. Rosamond Johnson except two, which were from Giuseppe Verdi's Aida that were interspersed among the episodes. Pageants in general were not financially successful resulting in difficulty securing suitable financial funding for the pageant movement as DuBois had hoped, writing disappointedly regarding the pageant movement he stated: “the white public has shown little or no interest in the movement. The American pageant Association has been silent…within my own race the usual petty but hurting insinuations of personal greed and selfishness…" In total only four productions (New York in 1913, Washington, DC, in 1915, Philadelphia in 1916, and Los Angeles in 1925) were ever mounted of The Star of Ethiopia, all of which were directed by Charles Burroughs for whom he publicly expressed his gratitude. Prior to the 1925 production in Los Angeles, Lucien B. Watkins would pen a poem published in The Crisis in 1918, dedicated to the pageant also titled "The Star of Ethiopia".
