= Gertrude Martin Rohrer =

American author and composer (1875–1968)

Gertrude Jane Martin Rohrer (December 25, 1875 – January 22, 1968) was an American author and composer who wrote many songs, including the state song of Pennsylvania, a book, and at least one operetta. She was active in several music clubs.

Rohrer was born in Indiana to Lucretia Mott McIntosh and the Reverend Daniel Cargill Martin. She graduated from Geneva College (Beaver Falls, Pennsylvania) in 1896 and her works are archived there. She married Frederick Findlay Rohrer and they had two sons, Frederick Findlay Rohrer Jr. and Donald Rohrer.

Rohrer's songs were recorded by Victor Records (BVE-3514) and Columbia Records (W148742). She belonged to the Pennsylvania Federation of Music Clubs, the Manuscript Music Society (Pittsburgh) and served as president of the Tuesday Musical Club (Pittsburgh).

== Published songs and other works ==
Rohrer self-published some songs. Others were published by Eldridge Entertainment House Inc., G.M. Demarest, J. Fischer & Brother, the National Federation of Music Clubs, Theodore Presser Company, and Volkwein Brothers.

=== Operetta ===
- Playroom at Night

=== Prose ===
- Music and Musicians of Pennsylvania (a book compiled by Rohrer)
- My Garden (a poem)
- Toy Shop: a Christmas Play

=== Vocal ===
- "Boy of Mine"
- "Collect" (text by Mary Stewart)
- "Collect of the National Federation of Music Clubs" (three women's voices and piano)
- "From My Window"
- "Home Again"
- "Home from School"
- "I Miss You" (text by Scottie McKenzie Frasier)
- If I Were a Fairy (three women's voice and piano)
- "Invocation" (text is psalm 92)
- Light (three women's voices)
- "Love's on the Highway"
- "Memories"
- "My Little House" (text by Nancy B. Turner)
- "New Colossus"
- "Pennsylvania: A State Song"
- "Pennsylvania Juniors"
- "Results and Roses" (text by Edgar A. Guest)
- "Sleepy Song" (text by Charles Buxton Going)
- "Soul of Song" (text by Lillie Reed Zortman)
- "Spirit of England" (text by Alma Phillips)
- Wood-nymph (mixed quartet; text by Leonora Speyer)
- "Your Land and My Land" (text by George M. Demarest)
