= Carriebel Cole Plummer =

American educator

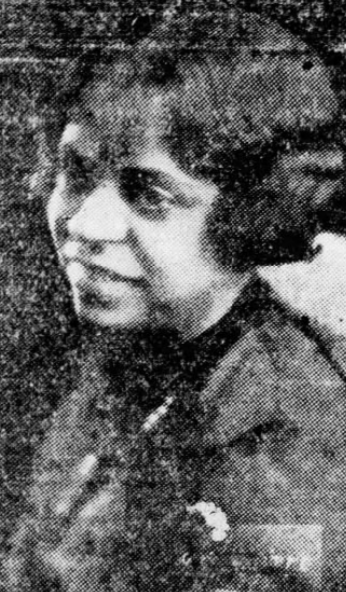
- Plummer, from a 1929 newspaper
- Born: Carriebel Cole; August 1892; Athens, Georgia, U.S.
- Died: after 1963
- Occupations: Educator, broadcaster, clubwoman
- Spouse: Frank V. Plummer
- Children: Jewel Plummer Cobb
- Relatives: Bob Cole (brother); Dora Cole Norman (sister)

Carriebel Beatrice Cole Plummer (August 1892 – after 1963) was an American educator, dancer, and clubwoman, based in Chicago. She was active in many Black organizations in Chicago, including the Urban League, Alpha Phi Alpha (her husband's fraternity), and the National Medical Association, and she held national office in her sorority, Sigma Gamma Rho.

== Early life and education ==
Cole was born in Athens, Georgia, and raised in New York City, the daughter of Robert Allen Cole Sr. and Isabella (Belle) Thomas Weldon Cole. Her older brother Bob Cole was a comic actor, composer, and songwriter, and her older sister Dora Cole Norman was a writer, educator, and clubwoman. Plummer studied dance education at Columbia University, and earned a bachelor's degree at Roosevelt University in 1945.

== Career ==
Plummer and her sister Dora were members of the New York Girls, an all-Black women's basketball team based in Harlem. She also taught dance and performed as a dancer.

Plummer wrote two ballets and was teaching physical education in Washington, D.C. schools when she married in 1920. She moved to Chicago, where her only child was born in 1924. She continued teaching dance classes. In 1921, she created a dance that was performed at the Hampton Institute Summer School. Plummer wrote a playlet that was performed at a large social event in 1927, with her brother Bob as one of the performers. She hosted a children's radio program in 1929, presenting young musicians and readers to the Chicago-area audience.

Plummer was active with the Sigma Gamma Rho sorority, as grand archivist of the national organization, and associate editor of its publication, Aurora. She was program chair of the Chicago chapter of the National Urban League. She was active in the women's auxiliary of the National Medical Association, and In the 1950s, she did publicity for the Chicago women's auxiliary of Alpha Phi Alpha.

== Personal life ==
Cole married dermatologist Frank Victor Plummer in 1920; Adam Clayton Powell Sr. officiated at their wedding ceremony. Their only child was cancer researcher and university president Jewel Plummer Cobb. Her husband died in 1964. Her grandson Roy Jonathan Cobb was a radiologist, and husband of actress Suzzanne Douglas.
