= Scottie McKenzie Frasier =

American teacher, author, newspaper editor, lecturer, and socialite

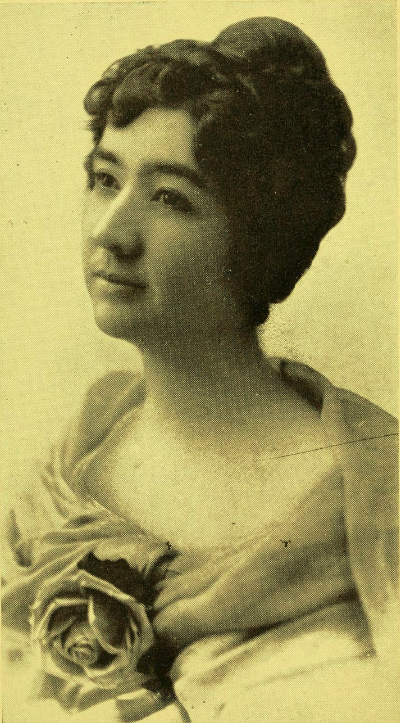
- Scottie McKenzie Frasier (1920)
- Born: Mary Scott McKenzie; September 7, 1884; Talladega, Alabama, U.S.
- Died: November 21, 1964 (aged 80); Dothan, Alabama, U.S.
- Education: Judson College; Columbia University Graduate School of Journalism
- Occupations: teacher; author; newspaper editor; lecturer; socialite; suffragist
- Spouse: Alfred Smith Frasier (m. 1908)
- Writing career
- Genres: short stories; poetry

Signature
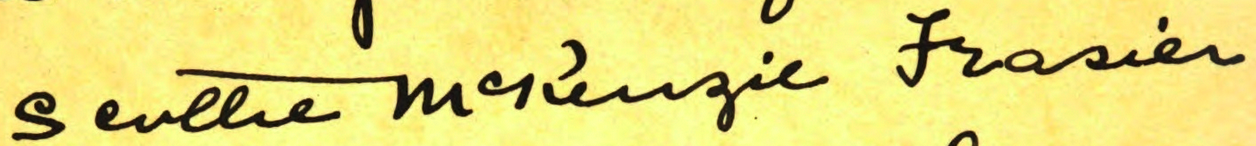

Scottie McKenzie Frasier (1884-1964) was an American teacher, author, newspaper editor, lecturer, and socialite. She became a suffrage advocate while living in New York City and co-founded the Dothan Equal Suffrage Association after removing to Dothan, Alabama. Frasier's activities during World War I included being a Four Minute Speaker.

== Early life and education ==
Mary Scott (nickname, "Scottie") McKenzie was born in Talladega, Alabama, September 7, 1884. She was the daughter of William and Leila (Hood) McKenzie, of Talladega, the former a Confederate soldier having enlisted at the age of seventeen. She was a granddaughter of Dr. Robert and Frances (Weisinger) Hood, of Cahaba, Alabama, the former a Confederate soldier who died during the Civil War with pneumonia, the latter, a descendant of Lawrence Washington, and of Dr. Henry and Amanda (Talmadge) McKenzie, the former a graduate of the Transylvania University and one of the first settlers of Talladega. She was a great-granddaughter of Thomas Dewitt and Tabitha (Washburn) Talmadge, of Jefferson County, Kentucky, and of Murdock and Rebecca (Tyson) McKenzie, the former a native of Scotland who emigrated to the U.S. in 1802, settling in Chatham County, North Carolina. She was a great-great-granddaughter of Kenneth and Christie McKenzie, of Scotland, and of Campbell and Tabitha (Dulaney) Washburn, the former an American Revolutionary War soldier, and of Berry and Ann Tyson, of Moore County, North Carolina. She was a great-great-great-granddaughter of Daniel and Margaret Dulaney, the former founded a town in Maryland which bears his name. The Dulaneys were among the most prominent of the members of the Maryland colony, one of that name having been the provincial secretary. The first member of the Hood family located in Virginia and married an Arundel of the English family of that name. Frasier's siblings were Clarence, Margret, Frances, William, Robert, and Alleen.

Frasier graduated from the Talladega high school in 1901, and from Judson College, Marion (degree and teaching certification, 1903).

== Career ==
She then taught in the public schools of Talladega and Greenville, Alabama, the Albertville agricultural college, and was elected assistant lady principal of Judson College, but married two weeks before the opening of the college. In 1914, she attended the Columbia University Graduate School of Journalism, short story department, studied public speaking under Mary Sandall, at Carnegie Hall, and attended lectures on psychology.

Fagots of fancy

Frasier was a writer of verse and short stories from childhood. She did newspaper work for four years in New York City. She also wrote a series of articles, "Southerners Who Have Made Good in New York", for the Montgomery Advertiser in 1915.

Fraser was regular contributor to The American Poetry Magazine, The Nomad, and The Peacock. Her poetry appeared in, Correct English and Current Literary Review ... (1913),American Poetry Magazine (1919), Davis' Anthology of Newspaper Verse (1922), Indiana Poetry (1925), and also in Braithwaite's Magazine Anthology (1922).

In 1920, Frasier issued a book of poems, Fagots of fancy. Of Things That Are Mine (1923), a reviewer of Pearson's Magazine stated, "Scottie McKenzie ... has produced a volume of free verse unadulterated by music, imagination, or any other quality of poetry." A Bookman reviewer was equally critical of the work:— "In Things That Are Mine (Steen Hinrichsen) Scottie McKenzie Frasier trills cheerfully and unabashedly over a few slurred and time worn poetic roundelays. Like the indefatigable robin - which bird might be called her mascot, so often does she wear it on her shoulder - Mrs. Frasier's song is yellow billed and trite, verging on the quack, bare of distinction save for an occasional felt word or phrase. It is this unrelieved authority, this brightness, this alertness which is the despairing feature of her verse. One feels that the author, like the robin, is too busy being assertive to listen to the secret stilly singing whence proceeds real creation."

Frasier looked after the business interests of the Frasier Ellis Hospital. In 1914–15, she lectured in the east on practical psychology. Other lecture topics included "How to Become a $30,000 Man", "What Shall We Do with Our Talents?", "The 100 Per Cent Store", and "Modern Poets". During World War I, she organized ten counties for Four Minute Men; served as vice chair of the Woman's Division of Four Minute Men of Alabama; and spoke for liberty bond and war saving stamp drives.

She was a member of the Alabama Equal Suffrage and League of Women Voters boards; Pen and Brush Club, New York City; Writers club, Indianapolis, Indiana; Press and authors club, Montgomery, Alabama; New Century Club, Dothan; and founder of the Sorosis club, Thomaston, Alabama and Writer's club, Dothan.

== Personal life ==
On October 21, 1908, at Talladega, she married Dr. Alfred Smith Frasier. They made their residence in Dothan.

Scottie McKenzie Frasier died in Dothan, Alabama, November 21, 1964.

== Legacy ==
- At the 1920 meeting of the Alabama Federation of Women’s Clubs, she was awarded the Press and authors club prize for the best prayer.
- The opening poem of Fagots of Fancy (1920), "Gifts", won the first prize in a poetry contest conducted by the Alabama Federation of Women's Clubs.
- Composer Gertrude Martin Rohrer used Frasier’s text for her 1924 song “I Miss You.”

== Selected works ==
- Fagots and fancy, 1920 (text)
- Things that are Mine, 1922 (text)
- The Guest's Prayer, 1923
- A Business Man's Prayer, 1925
- As We See it, 1935

== See also ==
- List of suffragists and suffragettes
