= Harrison Stewart =

American actor and lyricist (1882–1918)

Harrison Stewart (1882–1918) was a comedic actor and lyricist in the United States. He performed at the Pekin Theater in Chicago where he became a star and received top billing.

He was reported to have been a "plow-hand from a Virginia plantation" who studied at Booker T. Washington Industrial School.

After leaving the Pekin Theater in 1908 he took over for the ill Ernest Hogan as the lead in Oyster Man.

Before leaving the Pekin Theater in 1908, he played comedic roles in 36 uncertain shows and wrote lyrics for several shows.

After he went to New York, he was appointed head of Oyster Man company. He worked at OM company until his health started to deteriorate, causing the show to be suspended.

A photograph of him in blackface appears on the cover of a songsheet for "Give Me Shelter, Grub, and Spending Change Then I'll Be Satisfied" held in the Denver Public Library archives.

== Theater ==
- Two African Princes
- Captain Rufus (1907)
- The Husband (1907)
- In Zululand (1907)
