= Charles Sidney Gilpin =

American stage actor (1878–1930)

Charles Sidney Gilpin

Charles Sidney Gilpin (November 20, 1878 – May 6, 1930) was a stage actor in Canada and the United States. He played in two New York City debuts: the 1919 premier of John Drinkwater's Abraham Lincoln and the lead role of Brutus Jones in the 1920 premiere of Eugene O'Neill's The Emperor Jones (he later toured this play). In 1920, he was the first black person to receive The Drama League's annual award as one of ten people who had done the most that year for American theatre. He also appeared in films.

== Early life and education ==
Gilpin was born in Richmond, Virginia, to Peter Gilpin (a factory worker) and Caroline White (a nurse); he attended St. Francis School for Colored Children in that city. He started work as an apprentice in the Richmond Planet print shop before finding his career in theater. He first performed on stage as a singer at the age of 12. Prior to becoming a stage actor full-time, he worked as a printer and a pressman at several black newspapers during the late 1880s and into the 1890s, while getting some part-time work in vaudeville. He married Florence Howard in 1897, and they had one son.

== Career ==
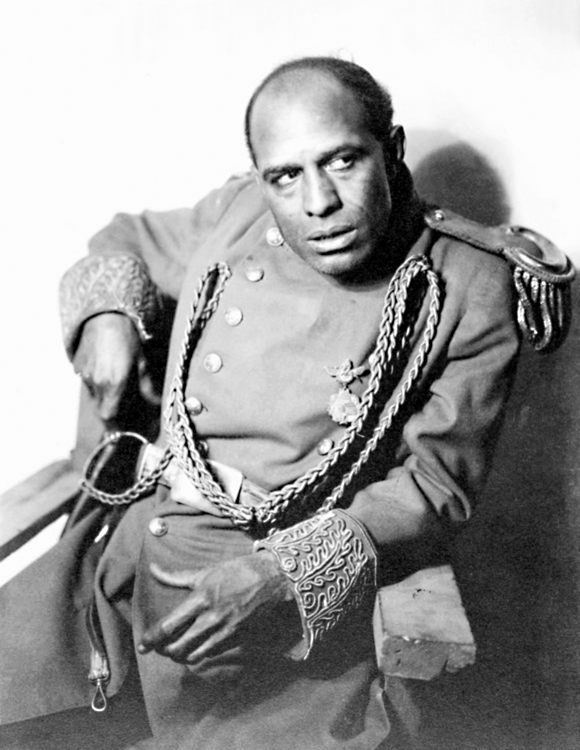
Charles S. Gilpin in The Emperor Jones (1920)

In 1896 at the age of 18, Gilpin joined a minstrel show, leaving Richmond and beginning a life on the road that lasted for many years. When between performances on stage, like many performers, he worked odd jobs to earn money: as a printer, barber, boxing trainer, and railroad porter. In 1903, he joined Hamilton, Ontario's Canadian Jubilee Singers.

In 1905, he started performing with traveling musical troupes of the Red Cross and the Candy Shop of America. He also played his first dramatic roles and honed his character acting in Chicago. He performed with Robert T. Motts' Pekin Theater in Chicago for four years until 1911. Soon after, he toured the United States with the Pan-American Octetts. Gilpin worked with Rogers and Creamer's Old Man's Boy Company in New York. In 1915, Gilpin joined the Anita Bush Players, led by Anita Bush, as they moved from the Lincoln Theater in Harlem to the Lafayette Theatre. As New York theater was expanding, this was a time when the theatrical careers of many famous black actors were launched.

In 1916, Gilpin made a memorable appearance in whiteface as Jacob McCloskey, a slave owner and villain of Dion Boucicault's The Octoroon. Though Gilpin left Bush's company over a salary dispute, his reputation allowed him to get the role of Rev. William Curtis in the 1919 premier of John Drinkwater's Abraham Lincoln.

Gilpin's Broadway debut led to his being cast in the premier of Eugene O'Neill's The Emperor Jones. He played the lead role of Brutus Jones to great critical acclaim, including a lauded review by writer Hubert Harrison in Negro World. Gilpin's achievement resulted in The Drama League's naming him as one of the 10 people in 1920 who had done the most for American theater. He was the first black American so honored. Following the Drama League's refusal to rescind the invitation, Gilpin refused to decline it. When the League invited Gilpin to their presentation dinner, some people found it controversial. At the dinner, he was given a standing ovation of unusual length when he accepted his award. Although Gilpin continued to perform the role of Brutus Jones in the U.S. tour that followed the Broadway closing of the play, he had a falling-out with O'Neill. Gilpin wanted O'Neill to remove the word "nigger", which occurred frequently in the play. The playwright refused, asserting its use was consistent with his dramatic intentions.

In 1921, Gilpin was awarded the NAACP's Spingarn Medal. He was also honored at the White House by President Warren G. Harding. A year later, the Dumas Dramatic Club (now the Karamu Players) of Cleveland renamed itself the Gilpin Players in his honor.

When they could not come to a reconciliation, O'Neill replaced Gilpin with Paul Robeson as Brutus Jones in the London production.

In early April 1922, Gilpin became one of the first black performers to give a dramatic presentation on radio. He gave readings from "The Emperor Jones" over greater Boston station WGI, from their Medford Hillside studios.

After the extended controversy and the disappointment of losing his signature role, Gilpin started drinking heavily. He never again performed on Broadway. He died in 1930 in Eldridge Park, New Jersey, his career in shambles. He was buried in an unmarked grave in Woodlawn Cemetery in the Bronx, his funeral arranged by friends shortly after his death.

In 1991, 61 years after his death, Gilpin was inducted into the American Theater Hall of Fame.

== Relationship with Eugene O'Neill ==
O'Neill had major influence on African American actors, in particular Gilpin and Paul Leroy Robeson. O'Neill and Robeson worked on three productions together: All God's Chillun Got Wings (1924), The Emperor Jones (1924), and The Hairy Ape (1931). Gilpin was the first actor to play the role of Emperor Jones when it was first staged on November 1, 1920, by the Provincetown Players at the Playwright's Theater in New York City. This production was O'Neill's first real smash hit. The Players' small theater was too small to cope with audience demand for tickets, and the play was transferred to another theater. It ran for 204 performances and was hugely popular, and toured in the States with this cast for the next two years. Gilpin continued to perform the role of Brutus Jones in the U.S. tour that followed the Broadway closing of the play, and in 1920 became the first black American to receive the Drama League of New York's annual award as one of the ten people who had done the most that year for American theater. The following year Gilpin was awarded the NAACP's Spingarn Medal. He was also honored at the White House by president Warren G. Harding. A year later, the Dumas Dramatic Club (now the Karamu Players) of Cleveland renamed itself the Gilpin Players in his honor. Though the acclaimed actor continued to perform in subsequent productions of the play, he eventually had a falling-out with O'Neill who argued with Gilpin's tendency to change his use of the word "nigger" to "Negro" and "colored" during performances. Gilpin wanted O'Neill to remove the word "nigger" from the play altogether, which occurred frequently in the play, but the playwright refused, arguing its use was consistent with his dramatic intentions and that the use of language was, in fact, based on a friend, an African-American tavern-keeper on the New London waterfront that was O'Neill's favorite drinking spot in his home town. When they could not come to a reconciliation, O'Neill replaced the middle-aged Gilpin with the much younger and then unknown Paul Robeson, who had only performed on the concert stage. Robeson starred in the title role in the 1924 New York revival and in the London production.

In 1924 he was in Dixie to Broadway and in 1925 he was in the play So That's That by Joseph Byron Totten.

He received excellent reviews and, coupled with his performance in the 1928 London production of the musical Show Boat, went on to worldwide fame as one of the great artists of the 20th century. The show was again revived in 1926 at the Mayfair Theatre in Manhattan, with Gilpin again starring as Jones and also directing the show. The production, which ran for 61 performances, is remembered today for the acting debut of a young Moss Hart as Smithers and broke social barriers and defied conventions of the day as the first American play to feature an African-American central character portrayed in a serious manner. The play was adapted for a 1933 feature film starring Paul Robeson, directed by Dudley Murphy, an avant-garde filmmaker of O'Neill's Greenwich Village circle who pursued the reluctant playwright for a decade before getting the rights from him. Gilpin continued to make a small living performing monologues from O'Neill's play at church gatherings before his death in 1930.
