= Joseph Erskine Agnew =

Music publisher and author (1868/69 – 1949)

Joseph Erskine Agnew (1868/69 – December 1, 1949) was a musician, arranger, music store proprietor, and music publisher in Des Moines, Iowa and later Newton, Iowa briefly. He played the mandolin. He became a nationally prominent band music publisher. Sheet music published by his Agnew Music Publishing Company is in the collections of the Library of Congress, the University of Missouri–Kansas City, and the University of Rochester.

He was born in Ohio.

He acquired "Nappy Lee" from Joe Jordan (musician). The sheet music Agnew published for it is part of the Library of Congress holdings. He copyrighted a valse by Myron A. Bickford. He also copyrighted an arrangement of a work by J. Offenbach. He copyrighted an arrangement of concert waltzes by Guy Sterling (musician) for the mandolin.

He wrote "The 20th Century Method for Guitar" (1901, 1907). He published "Musical Novelties for Mandolin Orchestra: The Cleveland Two Step".

In 1917 he advertised various compositions of New Band Music in the Musical Messenger.

He moved his business to Newton, Iowa where he was a band leader.

He sold his store to the Volkwein Brothers of Pittsburgh in 1939.

He lived the last 25 years of his life in Kansas City, where he died in 1949. He is interred in a family plot at Graceland Cemetery in Creston, Iowa.
