= Volkwein Brothers =

Music business in Pennsylvania

Volkwein Brothers, also known as Volkwein's Music, is a music business in Pittsburgh, Pennsylvania. It was continuously run by the same family for three generations until the early 2020s when the family sold their shares to the DiIanni family. It was opened in 1905 by immigrants from Germany, brothers Jacob C. Volkwein (1877–1961) and Rudolph G. Volkwein (1879–1956).

Rudolph and J. C. Volkwein worked for F. Bechtel before acquiring his sheet music and small goods businesses. Photographs of the storefront and center column were taken in 1915. In 1923 the store's window was taken up with a display for an oriental foxtrot called "Fate".

Volkwein's acquired Joseph Erskine Agnew's music business in 1939.

Vollwein Brothers published James V. Colonna's "America Forever" march after Pearl Harbor was attacked. In 1960, they published Gertrude Rohrer’s state song “Pennsylvania.”

The University of Maryland has a collection of their band music. The Carnegie Library of Pittsburgh has a box of Volkwein music books.

The store sells sheet music, instruments, and has offered lessons. One of its instructors was prominent pianist Charlotte Enty Catlin. Billy Strayhorn was a customer and took lessons from Catlin.

The Andy Warhol Museum took over the store's building.
