= Alpha Physical Culture Club =

The Alpha Physical Culture Club was an athletic club in Harlem, New York City, and home of the Alpha Black Five basketball team. Established in 1904, it was the first black athletic club in the United States. It was started by Conrad Norman. Its sister organization was the New York Girls basketball team.
