= Jewel Plummer Cobb =

American university president (1924–2017)

Jewel Cobb
- Jewel Plummer Cobb, 1975
- Born: January 17, 1924; Chicago, Illinois, U.S.
- Died: January 1, 2017 (aged 92); Maplewood, New Jersey, U.S.
- Education: Talladega College; New York University
- Occupations: biologist; cancer researcher; academic administrator; dean
- Employers: University of Illinois; New York University; Sarah Lawrence College; Connecticut College; Douglass College; California State University, Fullerton; Marine Biological Laboratory
- Awards: Achievement in Excellence Award from the Center for Excellence in Education; Candace Award

Jewel Plummer Cobb (January 17, 1924 – January 1, 2017) was an American biologist, cancer researcher, professor, dean, and academic administrator. She contributed to the field of cancer research by studying treatments for melanoma. Cobb was an advocate for increasing the representation of women and students of color in universities, and she created programs to support students interested in pursuing graduate school.

== Early life ==
Jewel Isadora Plummer was the only child of Frank V. Plummer, and Carriebel (Callie) Plummer. Both of her parents had lived in New York City Her mother, Carriebel Cole Plummer, worked as a physical education and dance teacher after studying dance at Columbia University. Carriebel re-entered college at the same time that Jewel enrolled, and graduated from Roosevelt University in 1945 with a BA. Jewel's father, Frank, was the first Black person to graduate with a Doctor of Medicine from Harvard University, becoming a physician specializing in dermatology. Plummer's paternal grandfather was a freed slave who graduated from Howard University in 1898 and made a living as a pharmacist.

Jewel Plummer Cobb's economically privileged upbringing offered her opportunities for intellectual exploration, from her father's scientific library to her education at several multiracial institutions. She anticipated becoming a physical education teacher, but her interest in science solidified during her sophomore year in high school whilst looking through a microscope in biology class. This interest was encouraged by her biology teacher and she was fascinated by books on microorganisms like Paul DeKruif's The Microbe Hunters.

== Higher education ==
Cobb matriculated at the University of Michigan in 1948. Dissatisfied with segregated housing for African-American students at Michigan, she transferred to Talladega College in Alabama. Talladega College did not accept transfer credits, forcing Cobb to start anew. In spite of this, she completed her course work in three years instead of the standard four. She graduated with a BA in biology in 1944 and became a member of the Alpha Kappa Alpha sorority.

Cobb initially was denied a fellowship for graduate study in biology at New York University, allegedly due to her race, but was granted the fellowship after an interview. She earned her MS from New York University in 1947, and her PhD with a focus on cell physiology in 1950.

Her dissertation, Mechanisms of Pigment Formation, examined melanin pigment granules formations in vitro using the enzyme tyrosinase. In 1949, she was appointed an independent investigator at Woods Hole Marine Biological Laboratory. In 2021, the town renamed a road near the Marine Biological Laboratory "Jewel Cobb Road" in honor of Cobb.

== Professional life ==
After receiving her Ph.D, Cobb became a biology teaching fellow at New York University while also working for the National Cancer Institute at Harlem Hospital (1950–1952).

=== University of Illinois College of Medicine ===
From 1952–1954 Cobb was an instructor in anatomy in Chicago at the University of Illinois College of Medicine where she taught histology.

=== Hunter College ===
Shortly thereafter, Cobb returned to New York, serving as an assistant professor for NYU's post graduate medical school (1955–60), while also working as a visiting lecturer at Hunter College (1956–57).

=== Sarah Lawrence College ===
From 1960–69, Cobb was employed as head of the biology laboratory at Sarah Lawrence College. While there, she conducted research for participants in the National Science Foundation.

=== Connecticut College ===
Cobb served as a professor of Zoology and as Dean of Arts and Sciences at Connecticut College from July 1969 until July 1976. Cobb was the first black Dean in the College's history. Upon accepting the position at Connecticut College, she stated: "This is a college in transition, moving forward at an exciting pace. We need more black students and teachers to help us formulate and carry out our bold new plans."

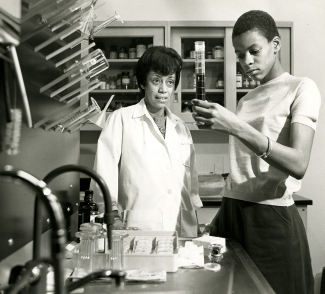
Jewel Plummer Cobb with a trainee Credit Connecticut College Linda Lear Center for Special Collections and Archives-crop

During her time at Connecticut College, she implemented a Black Scholarship program that provided financial assistance to at least 37 Black undergraduates at the college. The scholarship intended to increase financial assistance for students of color. This work inspired similar programs at other universities.

Cobb also established a Fifth Year Post-Baccalaureate Pre-Medical Program, which provided financial assistance and educational opportunities for minority students at the College who wanted to pursue careers in medicine or dentistry. Students were provided with resources for tutoring and counseling. Just five years after this program was established, these students were accepted into graduate programs, which included, Yale, Georgetown, and the University of Connecticut.

While in Connecticut, Dr. Cobb served as a member of the Lawrence and Memorial Hospital in New London, in addition to being elected Director of the American Council on Education, (1973–1976). Dr Cobb, as member of the National Science Board and advisor to the American Association for the Advancement of Science, chaired a conference of 30 minority women scientists to provide recommendations to schools, policy-makers and the US government on how to recruit more women of color into the sciences. The highly influential report was published as The Double Bind: The Price of Being a Minority Woman in Science.

Due to the many roles, Cobb worked long hours. She did laboratory work in the early morning followed by administrative work before teaching in the afternoons.

=== Marine Biological Laboratory ===
While a graduate student, Cobb spent the summer of 1949 as an independent investigator at the Marine Biological Laboratory, where she studied the inhibition of cell division in sea urchin (Arbacia) eggs. This was an early foray into a research interest Cobb would develop extensively in later years: how hormones, ultraviolet light and chemotherapeutic drugs can cause changes in cell division. Cobb’s first summer at MBL as a graduate student led to a deep connection with Woods Hole, where she eventually bought a second home. She became a MBL Corporation member in 1972 and was named an emeritus member of the MBL Society in 2007. Cobb was a Library Reader for many years, and also served on the MBL Campaign Steering Committee from 1997 to 2000.

=== Douglass Residential College ===
In July 1976, Cobb decided to leave Connecticut College and become a dean and professor of Biological Sciences at Douglass Residential College at Rutgers University and a full-time administrator for the Women's division of Rutgers. Cobb's greatest hesitation in leaving the College concerned limitations in continuing her research to the same degree due to her new role.

While at Douglass, Cobb (alongside nine other Americans) was selected by the Rockefeller Foundation to participate in a global conference in Italy concerning the future of higher education for women. Additionally, in April 1978, Cobb was nominated by President Carter as a member of the Board of Foreign Scholarships, the organization responsible for determining Fulbright eligibility.

=== California State University, Fullerton ===
Cobb was appointed President of California State University, Fullerton in 1981 where she became the first African-American woman to lead a major university in the western United States. She began to improve campus facilities at Fullerton from the start of her term.

Cobb was successful in obtaining funds for the construction of an Engineering and Computer Science Building which was constructed with state funds, as well as the Ruby Gerontology Center, which was the first building in the College's history to be funded through private donations. She also acquired financial capital for the construction of the first ever student residence on campus. The completion of this apartment complex was later named in her honor. Cobb also negotiated an agreement with the Marriott Corporation and the city of Fullerton for a lease to construct a hotel, allowing her to use available funds for the construction of a campus sports complex. The majority of the planning for the Science Laboratory Center, now called Dan Black Hall, was done while Cobb was president.

At Fullerton, some faculty members did not share Cobb's interests in research and rebuilding, holding that the primary mission of the college was to teach. Her decision to enter into the agreement to build the hotel on campus and to add a satellite campus in the southern part of Orange County thus generated criticism on campus. Cobb brought both of these issues to the Faculty Senate for a vote. Both times, her decisions were upheld.

In 1990, aged 66, she was forced to retire under a rule imposed by W. Ann Reynolds, the Chancellor of the California State University System, requiring all campus presidents aged 65 or older to retire. In response to her departure, Julian Foster, a campus leader and prominent political scientist, expressed Cobb's emphasis on research and scholarship to be her most important contribution to Cal State Fullerton.

In 1990, after retiring, Cobb was named California State University Trustee Professor for its Los Angeles division. She became a life member of the board of trustees in 2005.

In 1991, she became the principal investigator at Southern California Science and Engineering ACCESS Center and Network, which assists middle school and high school students from disadvantaged backgrounds pursue a future in the fields of science and engineering.

In 2001, Cobb became the principal investigator for Science Technology Engineering Program (STEP) Up for Youth—ASCEND project at California State University, Los Angeles.

== Research ==
Cobb's research included work on the relationship between melanin and skin damage, and on the effects of hormones, ultraviolet light, and chemotherapy agents on cell division. Cobb found that deeper melanin pigmentation can protect cells from damaging UV radiation. People with a darker skin tone have a less chance of getting skin cancer rather than lighter skin people. Cobb discovered that methotrexate was effective in the treatment of certain skin cancers, lung cancers, and childhood leukemia. This drug is still being used in chemotherapy today to give treatment to a variety of cancers and autoimmune diseases which includes: breast cancer, head and neck cancers, lung cancer, leukemia, and some types of lymphoma. Cobb was the first to publish data on actinomycin D and its ability to cause a reduction of nucleoli in the nucleus of normal and malignant human cells.

She received a $5,000 grant from the American Cancer Society to continue her research in "Direct Hormone Action to Human and Mouse Melanomas in Tissue Culture." This grant supported her research and a broader examination of pigment cell growth and differentiation in human and mouse melanomas.

Other support for her cancer research came through her post-doctoral fellowship, research grants from the: Damon Runyon, National Science Foundation, National Cancer Institute, and Public Health Services.

Cobb was part of the United States International Cancer congresses in London (1958) and Moscow (1962) and served on the advisory board to Mohegan Community College. She was awarded the National Institute of Health Fellowship for $68,000, where she spent seven months in Naples, Italy continuing cell growth research at the International Laboratory of Genetics and Biophysics.

Throughout her career, she collaborated with other notable researchers, including oncologist Jane C. Wright, Grace Antikajian, and Dorothy Walker Jones. Her most influential mentors were her bacteriology professor James R. Hayden and her biochemistry professor M.J. Kopac.

In recognition of her research achievements, Cobb was elected to the Institute of Medicine in the National Academy of Sciences in 1974. She was also a member of the National Science Board from 1974 to 1980.

== Additional societal contributions ==
Cobb was named Vice President of the Board for the 21st Century Foundation, dedicated to supporting the development of Black institutions that addressed issues in the Black community. Programs established by the organization included: economic, educational, and community development with the purpose of creating opportunities for people of color.

She was also a member of the American Association for the Advancement of Science, which supported both women and people of color in the field. Cobb was one of seven recognized by the Oakland Museum Association's Cultural and Ethnic Affairs for her contributions to science and/or technology. The museum's exhibition hoped to increase minority representation in the sciences by showcasing the accomplishments of people of color, including several of Cobb's findings.

As the keynote speaker at the 1971 Wheaton College commencement, Cobb called for an alliance between the Women's Liberation Movement and the Black Liberation Movement. She called for the equality of women, the abolition of abortion laws, and the demand for public child care in particular.

== Final years and legacy ==
Many of the policies and programs Cobb initiated during her administrative careers take form in her 1979 paper, Filters for Women in Science, where she expressed concerns about female representation in science and engineering. Through an analogy connecting her passion for science and demand for equity, Cobb claimed that the characteristics of the filtrate passing through a filter are primarily determined by the size of the pores, which she connected with the limitations of female employment in science.

Cobb's insistence on providing resources and programs to increase minority representation at her colleges of employment define her legacy outside of the laboratory.

A former student, Timothy Yarboro, stated, "I would not have become a doctor. Because of her, I knew it was possible."

Cobb resided in Maplewood, New Jersey, until her death on January 1, 2017, at the age of 92. She died because of complications with Alzheimer's Disease. She was survived by her only child, Jonathan, a radiologist specializing in magnetic resonance imaging.

=== Honors, awards, and memberships ===
Honorary doctorates

- Medical College of Pennsylvania
- Northern University
- Rensselaer Polytechnic Institute
- Rutgers University
- Tuskegee University

Awards

- Reginald Wilson Award
- Candace Award, National Coalition of 100 Black Women, 1982
- 1999 Achievement in Excellence Award from the Center for Excellence in Education

Memberships

- Human Resource Commission
- Sigma Xi
- National Academy of Sciences (Institute of Medicine)
- National Science Foundation.
- Allied Corporation's board of directors
- Tissue Culture Association of the Education Committee (1972–1974)
- Marine Biological Laboratory
- Board of Trustees for the Institute of Education Management

== Publications ==
- Cobb, Jewel Plummer, Dorothy G. Walker, and Jane C. Wright. "Comparative chemotherapy studies on primary short-term cultures of human normal, benign, and malignant tumor tissues—a five-year study." Cancer research 21.5 (1961): 583.
- Cobb, Jewel Plummer, and Dorothy G. Walker. "Studies on Human Melanoma Cells in Tissue Culture I. Growth Characteristics and Cytology." Cancer research 20.6 (1960): 858–867.
- Cobb, Jewel Plummer, and Dorothy G. Walker. "Effect of Actinomycin D on Tissue Cultures of Normal and Neoplastic Cells23." (1958).
- A National Assessment of Performance and Participation of Women in Mathematics, 1979
- A Study of the Learning Environment at Women's Colleges, 1981
- A Survey of Black American Doctorates, 1968
- A Survey of the Current Status and Plans of Colleges Traditionally for Women Only, 1972
- A Survey of Research Concerns on Women's Issues, 1975
- Academic Challenges, 1990
- Access and Power for Blacks in Higher Education, 1972
- Advancing Women's Leadership in Science, 1995
- An Assessment of Factors Affecting Female Participation in Advanced Placement Programs in Mathematics, Chemistry, and Physics, 1975
- An Impact Analysis of Sponsored Projects to Increase the Participation of Women in Careers in Science and Technology, 1977
- And Pleasantly Ignore my Sex, 1974
- Annual Report of the National Science Foundation Committee on Equal Opportunities in Science and Technology, 1982
- Black Initiative and Governmental Responsibility, 1987
- Campus 1970, Where do Women Stand? Research Report of a Survey on Women in Academe, 1970
- Careers in Science and Engineering for Black Americans, 1972
- Catalyst Annual Report, 1978–1979
- Changing America: The New Face of Science and Engineering, 1989
- College Resource Council—Study on Seniors and Freshman of a Number of Colleges Within the Member Group, u.d.
- Committee on the Education and Employment of Women in Science and Engineering (CEEWISE), 1977–1979
- Data on Women in Scientific Research, 1977
- Degree Awards to Women: An Update, 1979
- Degrees Granted and Enrollment Trends in Historically Black Colleges: An Eight-Year Study, 1965
- Department of Health, Education and Welfare- Statement by the Director, National Cancer Program, National Cancer Institute, 1975

Academic offices
Preceded by Miles D. McCarthy	President of California State University, Fullerton; 1981–1990	Succeeded by Milton Gordon
