= Edna Alexander (singer) =

Canadian soprano (died 1913)

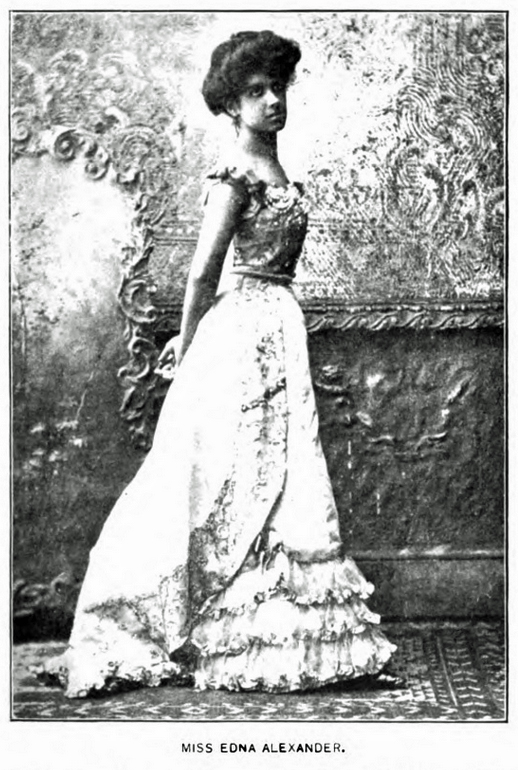
Photo from a 1902 article and interview in The Colored American

Edna Alexander was a Canadian-born soprano based in the United States and later Europe. She sang with various theater companies in the United States, including the Afro-American Opera Company, Cole & Johnson, and Williams and Walker Co.

== Biography ==
Alexander was born in Woodstock, Ontario, Canada, the daughter of George Alexander. When she was young, her family moved to Toledo, Ohio and then Chicago, Illinois. She started out singing as a child in the Quinn Chapel choir in Chicago, and later sang in the choir at Bethel Church.

In 1895 she moved to the East Coast, where she performed as a singer. In 1896 she was part of the Afro-American Opera Company. She was the lead soprano in Cole & Johnson's "A Trip to Coontown", and also performed for the Williams & Walker Company. In 1905, she traveled to Europe as part of a performance, and continued to live there until the end of her life. While abroad, she married "Billy" Farrell who worked in variety shows.

Alexander died from tuberculosis in August 1913 in Vienna, Austria.

== Theater ==
- Sons of Ham
- A Trip to Coontown
