= Melville Charlton =

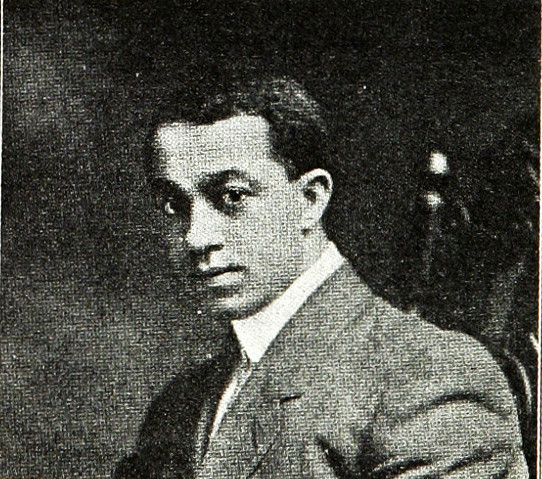
Melville Charlton

Melville Charlton (1880–1973) was an American organist, composer and music educator. He was the first African-American organist to be admitted to the American Guild of Organists. His piano composition, Poem Erotique, has continued to be popular with concert pianists. His papers are held as the Melville Charlton Collection at the New York Public Library.
