= The Barber (1916 film) =

1916 film by William D. Foster

The Barber is a 1916 short comedy film by William D. Foster. The silent film was shot in black and white.

The film's story depicts a barber overhearing a customer who seeks a Spanish language teacher for his wife, imposters, and hijinks.

The film was funded in part by Henry "Teenan" Jones, owner of The Elite Café. The film stars Anna Holt, Howard Kelly, and Edgar Lillison.
