= Lottie Grady =

American singer, dancer, and comedian (1887–1970)

- Born: Charlotte Grady; September 8, 1887
- Died: 1970 (aged 82–83)
- Occupations: Singer; dancer; comedian
- Spouse: Charles Roxborough (m. 1919; div. 1939)

Charlotte Grady Roxborough (September 8, 1887 – 1970) was a singer, dancer, and comedian who performed in theatrical productions and vaudeville as well as films. She was born to Wesley, a white father, and Susan (Kelly) Grady. She performed at the Pekin Theatre in Chicago where she was a star member of its stock company. She starred in William Foster's The Pullman Porter, in 1912, the first black motion picture production.

She was born in Chicago. Her photograph ran in a 1909 edition of the New York Age. She was described as well known and lauded for her performances in reviews.

In 1919, she married Charles Roxborough, a lawyer who served in the Michigan Senate. They had two children, John and Charles Jr. The couple divorced in 1939. She ran a saloon in Idlewild, Michigan.

== Theater ==
- The Merry Widower (musical) (1908)
- Mr. Lode of Koal (1909)
- Broadway Rastus (show)

== Filmography ==
- The Railroad Porter/ The Pullman Porter (1912)
- The Grafter and the Girl (1913)
