= A Trip to Coontown =

American musical comedy

- Music: Bob Cole and Billy Johnson
- Lyrics: Bob Cole and Billy Johnson
- Book: Bob Cole and Billy Johnson
- Basis: At Jolly Coon-ey Island by Bob Cole and Billy Johnson
- Premiere: 1897: New Jersey

A Trip to Coontown is an American musical comedy. It was performed, directed, and produced by African Americans. It was written and performed in by Bob Cole and Billy Johnson. and debuted it New Jersey in 1897 before touring in the U.S. and internationally. Its New York City debut was at the Third Avenue Theatre on April 4, 1898.

The musical was a reworking of Cole and Johnson's skit "At Jolly Coon-ey Island" which was written by Cole for an operatic variety company called Black Patti’s Troubadours (formed by Sissieretta Jones). A Trip to Coontown spoofed the popular musical A Trip to Chinatown (1891).

In the early 20th century the musical was staged in European cities.

== Cast ==
According to an October 1899 advertisement in The Allentown Leader, the show featured:

- Coontown Sextette
- Carter and Hillman's Bowery Spielers
- Alice MacKay, Contralto
- Freeman Sisters, acrobatic dancers
- Billy Johnson, "the Luckiest Coon in Town"
- Lloyd G. Gibbs, "Famous Colored Tenor"
- Edna Alexander, "Accomplished Soprano"
- Bob Cole, in his own laughable creations
- Sam Lucas, the "Favorite Colored Comedian"

== See also ==
- Coon song
- Minstrel show
