= The Railroad Porter =

US silent film

- Directed by: William D. Foster
- Written by: William D. Foster
- Produced by: William D. Foster
- Starring: Lottie Grady
- Production company: The Foster Photoplay Company
- Release date: 1913
- Country: United States

The Railroad Porter, also released as The Pullman Porter, is a film produced by The Foster Photoplay Company that was released in 1912 or 1913. It was the film company's first release and one of the earliest American films produced by African Americans.

== Background ==
It features stars from the Pekin Theatre's stock company. The company toured the film in the south along with its film The Fall Guy and Lottie Grady reportedly sang during the reel changing intermission.

The Railroad Porter was written, filmed, edited, and premiered in 1913. It was the first film produced and directed by an African American and featured an African American cast. It included depictions of an African American middle class.

Many of the actors showcased in The Railroad Porter were recognizable faces in days of black vaudeville. Lottie Grady, who was a former member of the Pekin stock company, played the wife in the film. Cassie Burch Slaughter played the 'Wife's Friend', Kid Brown played the 'Railroad Porter', Edgar Ellison played 'The Waiter', and Bell Coles played 'Police Officer'.

== Plot ==
The plot of The Railroad Porter revolves around a wife who, after not seeing her husband come home at his regular time, assumes that she has been temporarily abandoned. In response, she invites a well dressed waiter to dinner at her home. When her husband comes home, and sees his wife having dinner with another man, the husband pulls out a revolver and begins to threaten the waiter with it. The waiter, in turn, pulls out his own gun, and a commotion ensues in which nobody gets hurt and everything ends happily.

== Cast ==
- Lottie Grady
- Jerry Mills (performer)
- Cassie Burch Slaughter
- Kid Brown
- Edgar Lillison
- Bell Cole

== Release and reception ==
Though the movie first premiered at the States Theater, it was also shown at the Pekin Theatre and, eventually, the Grand Theater. The film got rave reviews as it played across the country and The Railroad Porter was playing to "crowded houses" before too long. The Railroad Porter even played at the famous Majestic Theater, and when it first played, "patrons jumped up and shouted, some laughed so hard that ushers had to silence them. The manager of the house states that it contains more wit and humor than any picture ever seen at the house." When The Railroad Porter was reviewed by other black journalists, Foster got commended for showing black life as normal, and not displaying "the race in a ridiculous light".
