= Harold Dadford West =

American biochemist

- Born: July 16, 1904; Flemington, New Jersey
- Died: March 5, 1974 (aged 69); Nashville, Tennessee
- Known for: threonine
- Scientific career
- Fields: biochemistry

Harold Dadford West (July 16, 1904 – March 5, 1974) was an American biochemist who was the first to synthesize threonine. Born in New Jersey, his father George, was from Washington D.C. and his mother, Mary, was from Rhode Island. He worked at Meharry Medical College in Nashville, Tennessee as a teacher. He was married to Jessie Juanita West and had at least two children, Edna (named after his older sister) and Harold West Jr. He died in 1974 in Nashville, Tennessee.

== See also ==
- threonine
