= Robert T. Motts =

American saloon and theater owner and racketeer (1861–1911)

- Born: June 24, 1861; Iowa
- Died: July 11, 1911 (aged 50); Chicago, Illinois
- Resting place: Washington, Iowa
- Other names: Bob Motts
- Known for: Owner of the Pekin Theatre

Robert T. Motts was an African American saloon owner and gambling racket leader, who established and managed Chicago's Pekin Theatre, an epicenter of African-American theater. Motts was an organizer in the Republican Party. He also owned theaters in New York City.

== Early life ==
Motts was born on June 24, 1861. His father, Thomas Motts, was a coal dealer in Muscatine, Iowa and died during the Civil War. His mother moved the five children to Washington, Iowa. At the age of 18, Motts left for St. Louis and later Chicago, where he worked odd jobs and then as a coachman for four years.

== Career ==
After the World's Fair of 1893, he invested in a saloon on 2700 State Street, owned by Snowden and Beasley. Eventually he bought out his business partners' shares and began to develop the Pekin Theatre.

A court order in New York enjoined Motts' theaters from having a show that infringed on a similarly named show.

== Death ==
Motts' health began to decline, but he continued to devote his time to managing the theatre. He arranged for his sister, Lucy Jackson, to have joint ownership of the business and eventually sold his last interest in the business before his death.

Motts died at his home on Calumet Avenue on July 11, 1911 from splenic leucemia. Motts' funeral was a major affair. Services were held at Quinn Chapel and Motts was interred in Washington, Iowa.
