= Bob Cole (composer) =

American composer, actor, playwright (1868–1911)

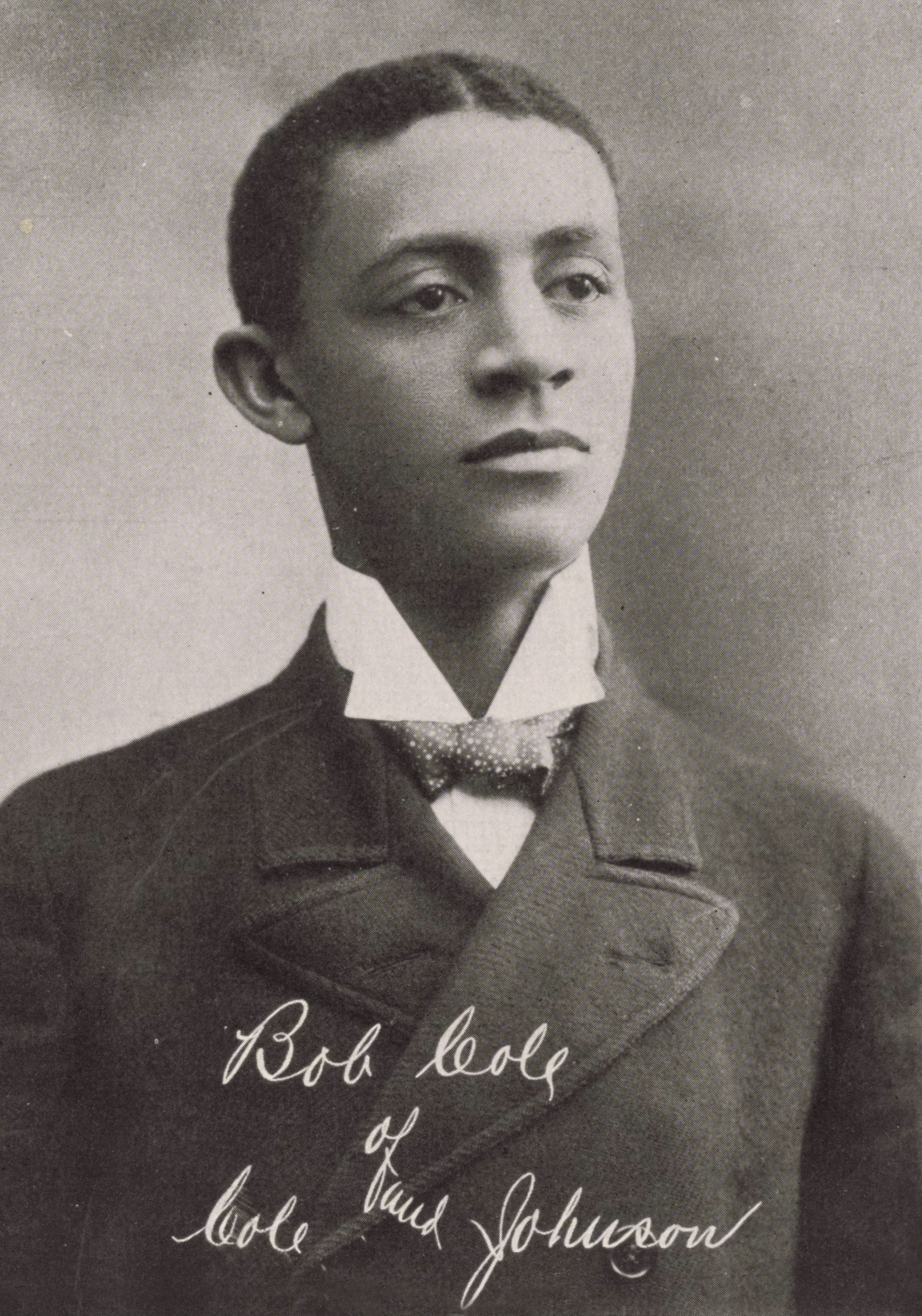
Bob Cole, ca. 1898

Robert Allen Cole Jr. (July 1, 1868 – August 2, 1911) was an American composer, actor, and playwright who produced and directed stage shows. In collaboration with Billy Johnson, he wrote and produced A Trip to Coontown (1898), the first musical entirely created and owned by black showmen. The popular song La Hoola Boola (1898) was a result of their collaboration. Cole later partnered with brothers J. Rosamond Johnson, a pianist and singer, and James Weldon Johnson, a pianist, guitarist and lawyer, creating more than 200 songs.

Their vaudeville act featured classical piano pieces and their musicals featured sophisticated lyrics without the usual stereotypes such as "hot-mamas" and watermelons. Success enabled Cole and Rosamond to tour America and Europe with their act. The trio's most popular songs were "Louisiana Lize" and "Under the Bamboo Tree" (1901?). Their more successful musicals were The Shoo-Fly Regiment (1906) and The Red Moon (1908, written without Weldon).

Cole was the pre‑eminent leader in the world of black musical theater both as a composer and as a performer. His skills in acting, writing, and directing were brought to the public eye through his early works: first, he produced the black musical A Trip to Coontown, where he joined alliance with Billy Johnson, followed by the production of popular songs such as " Under the Bamboo Tree", where he worked with J. Rosamond Johnson. Cole committed suicide by drowning himself in a creek in the Catskills in 1911 after a nervous breakdown and period of clinical depression that worsened in 1910.

== Family and early life ==
As stated in Thomas L. Riis' "'Bob' Cole: His Life and His Legacy to Black Musical Theater", few details of Cole's life before the transition into the development of black musicals can be found in research materials, including encyclopedias and historical articles on black theater.

The composer was born in Athens, Georgia, where his father (Robert Allen Cole, Sr.) and mother (Isabella Thomas Weldon) settled after the freedom of blacks through the Emancipation Proclamation. Although Athens, Georgia, was shattered by the war in the South and the racist environment of Southern society at the time, it became a prosperous city with prominent African American families; barbers, blacksmiths, shoemakers, and other sorts of community professionals were black. The people of Athens developed one of the earliest black newspapers, indicating the advancement and progression in education of blacks in the late 19th century. Cole's father took advantage of the opportunities provided in Athens, Georgia, and became well known through his political activism during the Reconstruction era of the South. Robert Cole's political role may have influenced his son's beliefs, especially in regards to the conditions of the African American race. During his involvement in politics, from 1867 to 1873, Robert Cole became a part of the black Athenians and assisted the Georgia State Legislature. In the end, Bob Cole's father, with his political side in the background, became a carpenter, supporting his family and his house on Broad Street.

=== Childhood years and adulthood ===
Bob Cole, born on July 1, 1868, was the first-born of his family, followed by five other siblings, including Dora Cole Norman and Carriebel Cole Plummer. His family was musical; both his parents were square dancers (Robert Cole, Sr., also played drums) and all the children of the household were educated in certain musical instruments. Bob played various instruments, such as the banjo, piano and cello, and created his own family band with the support of his sisters. At fifteen years of age, Bob had a violent confrontation with the son of the mayor of Athens, and had to flee the town to live with distant relatives, of his mother's side, in Florida. A short time later, Bob was reunited with his family after they moved to Atlanta, Georgia. In Atlanta, Bob was able to attend elementary school and possibly high school; however, he did not proceed towards higher education. Instead of enrolling in a college, Bob found a job at the Atlanta University, which became his approximation of the student experience – from the interview from his sister, he was able to gain a vast amount of knowledge due to his knowledge-packed environment.

== Early short-term careers in music ==
Still focused on the music world and following his musical inclinations, Cole moved to Florida, where he was able to be involved in a small string quartet for a short period of time. Later, he worked at a resort in Asbury Park, New Jersey, as a "singing bellboy". He later moved to Chicago where he became a comedian of a sort – he told jokes, sung, and played the guitar in various clubs throughout the city. His interest towards vaudeville plays and the later black musical genre (including "coon songs") originated from his work with his peer Lew Henry, who was also an amateur showman. These two young actors attempted to create a vaudeville act together; however, the act was not a success and soon ended. After his failed attempt in the field of vaudeville acting, Cole traveled to New York, preeminent area for novice actors in pursuit of theater or anything related to the theatrical genres, and formed an alliance with Pete Staples, who was well known in his performance as a mandolinist. Cole became Staples' comedic counterpart in their act together, but their collaboration ended shortly after it began. Due to the lack of information on the details of Bob Cole's experience in acting and music, including his early training, there were no solid facts of how Cole came to be the leading black composer and entrepreneur in black musicals. Although Cole seemed to be focused on the comedic and buffoonish aspect of African-American theater and acting, he did not submit to the norm of being involved in so-called "medicine shows" or the circus, unlike his predecessors. Rather than being confined to the traditional use of blackface makeup of early black minstrel shows, he denied the degrading use of such material and deviated from the conventional African American entertainment; thus, he began producing his own entertainment through either a partnership or just being solo.

== Gradual rise to stardom - The Creole Show ==
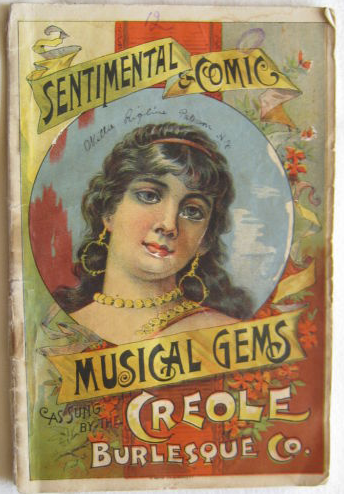
Cover of Musical Gems, a book of songs by Sam T. Jack's Creole Burlesque Co.

Coming from a small black family and gradually gaining popularity in the public eye, Cole began rising in the field of black musicals. A few years after, around the early 1890s, with the support of the Chicago firm of Will Rossitier, Bob Cole presented his two legally published songs: "Parthenia Took a Likin' to a Coon" and "In Shin Bone Alley". The titles give the general idea and tone of the songs – Cole incorporated his comedic nature and produced a minstrel-like tone to his songs. His rising soon allowed further opportunities to flow in; for instance, he was soon hired as a comedian by the white entrepreneur, Sam T. Jack, who created the Creole Show. The Creole Show, in short, focused on black women performers, which was extremely rare during the time; furthermore, in its movement towards breaking the norm, the show shattered the use of black stereotypes in typical minstrel shows, which included denying the usual plot setting at a slave plantation. By moving away from traditional minstrel shows, Sam T. Jack's production was predominantly influenced by the styles of vaudeville (with more focus on the beauty and exotic aspects of showgirls), reviving the cakewalk and adding fancy steps. Cole's role in the Creole Show soon gained popularity and he went from an ordinary comedian act to the headliner of the show. His success in the Creole Show, indicated by his popularity amongst his audience that resulted in a promotion, led him to create his own stage character, which he would carry on for another seven years: Willy Wayside, the red-whiskered hobo.

By 1896, as his fame progressed, Cole produced four "Genuine Negro songs by a Genuine Negro Minstrel" that were published by Brooks and Denton of New York and London. These four songs were: "Fly, fly, fly", "Move up, Johnson", "Colored aristocracy", and "Dem golden clouds". Cole's popularity and stardom began to accelerate through his involvement in top productions, such as "Black America". Soon, he was promoted and became a writer and stage manager for the Creole Show. By the early 1890s, he was partnered professionally with his future wife, Stella Wiley, a dancer from the Creole Show. His partnership led him to performances from New England to New York. Around 1894, he formed the All-Star Stock Company – a project that allowed him to train a professional group of actors, comedians and singers. The first production by this group was called Georgia 49, which included John Isham. There was no description or synopsis of the actual show for future reference.

== Black Patti's Troubadours: from fame to unemployment ==
Later, Cole became an important player in the first shows by Black Patti's Troubadours in 1896. Black Patti Troubadours was an American vaudeville group founded by Sissieretta Jones' ("The Black Patti"); their performances consisted of blackface minstrel songs and "coon songs", also featuring acrobats and comedians. Cole's association with this group allowed him to become involved with the Isham shows through the two groups' coalition – the partnered shows predominantly consisted of comedy sketches, vaudeville specialty acts (i.e. jugglers, singers, and comedians), and ending with a variety of opera-like singers.

Cole also managed his own Troubadour show in which he starred as Willy Wayside (in this case, his character was the tramp) in the musical At Jolly Coon-ey Island and performed a routine with Stella Wiley. The musical incorporated two of his own songs: "4-11-44" and "The Four Hundred's Ball", and music arrangements by its music director J. A. Raynes. Although Cole became the top performer amongst his peers, his significant contributions to the Troubadours did not result in higher pay, and he left the company, taking away his own written scripts and songs. Denounced as a thief and troublemaker by the company's white managers, Voelckel and Nolan, his reputation was damaged, and no production manager would hire him. Cole was forced to publish songs under a pseudonym – he used the name Will Handy for his later works after his own name was tainted.

== A Trip to Coontown ==
Cole soon established his own black production company with the group of individuals who also left the Troubadours. Out of that, he, with Billy Johnson and Will Accooe, in 1898, co-wrote the lyrics and music for A Trip to Coontown, which was the lengthier version of the musical programs he had previously written. The production became the supposed first black musical comedy. The musical, consisting of only black actors and revolving around the traditional minstrel stereotypes, delved into the story of a con artist, Jimmy Flimflammer, and his failed attempts to rob an elderly man of his pension. Furthermore, in order to maintain the interest of the audience, the play also included variety, or comedic, acts to liven the show.

Individuals can argue, as stated in Eileen Southern's The Origin and Development of the Black Musical Theater: A Preliminary Report, that A Trip to Coontown was not the first black-dominated musical play produced at the time. Because black musicals were originated from several genres of stage entertainment – the ballad opera, the music extravaganza, the comic opera, the minstrel show, and the variety show – there is a plausible argument that previous nineteenth-century black companies created such theatrical plays, and A Trip to Coontown was not the first black musical performed.

The show premiered in South Amboy, New Jersey, on September 27, 1897. The show went through a trial of shut-downs and controversy, where it was banned from showing in the United States; however, the play later gained popularity in Canadian theaters, and subsequently was revived and shown in New York. Theater-promoters Klaw and Erlanger terminated Cole's ban from the theater world and helped bring the show to the public. However, although Cole's previous scorned image was extinguished with the help of Klaw and Erlanger, Black Patti's Troubadours still attempted to ruin his career by directly competing with his own production company. The Troubadours planned their shows to be consistent with Cole's presentation of A Trip to Coontown, attempting to steal the spotlight. However, there were few evidence that proved that Cole and Johnson discovered the unscrupulous ruse of their competitors and avoided the confrontation altogether by destroying their booking contract with Michael Levitt. Although Cole was able to avoid the Troubadours' schemes, in the end, he was not able to avoid the lawsuit against his company from Levitt, who fined Cole and Johnson $1000. Cole's company faced several trials, including quarrels over finances and transportation; also, the competition of the Black Patti organization was a constant battle. Cole's group succeeded through Bob Cole's skills in management and his inventiveness in black show business. By 1900, A Trip to Coontown finally stopped its production, and the partnership between Cole and Billy Johnson ended due to either Johnson's alcoholic nature, or Cole's changing ideals in black musicals – he desired to test out another path in vaudeville plays and songwriting

== Union with the Johnson Brothers: a turn in Black entertainment ==
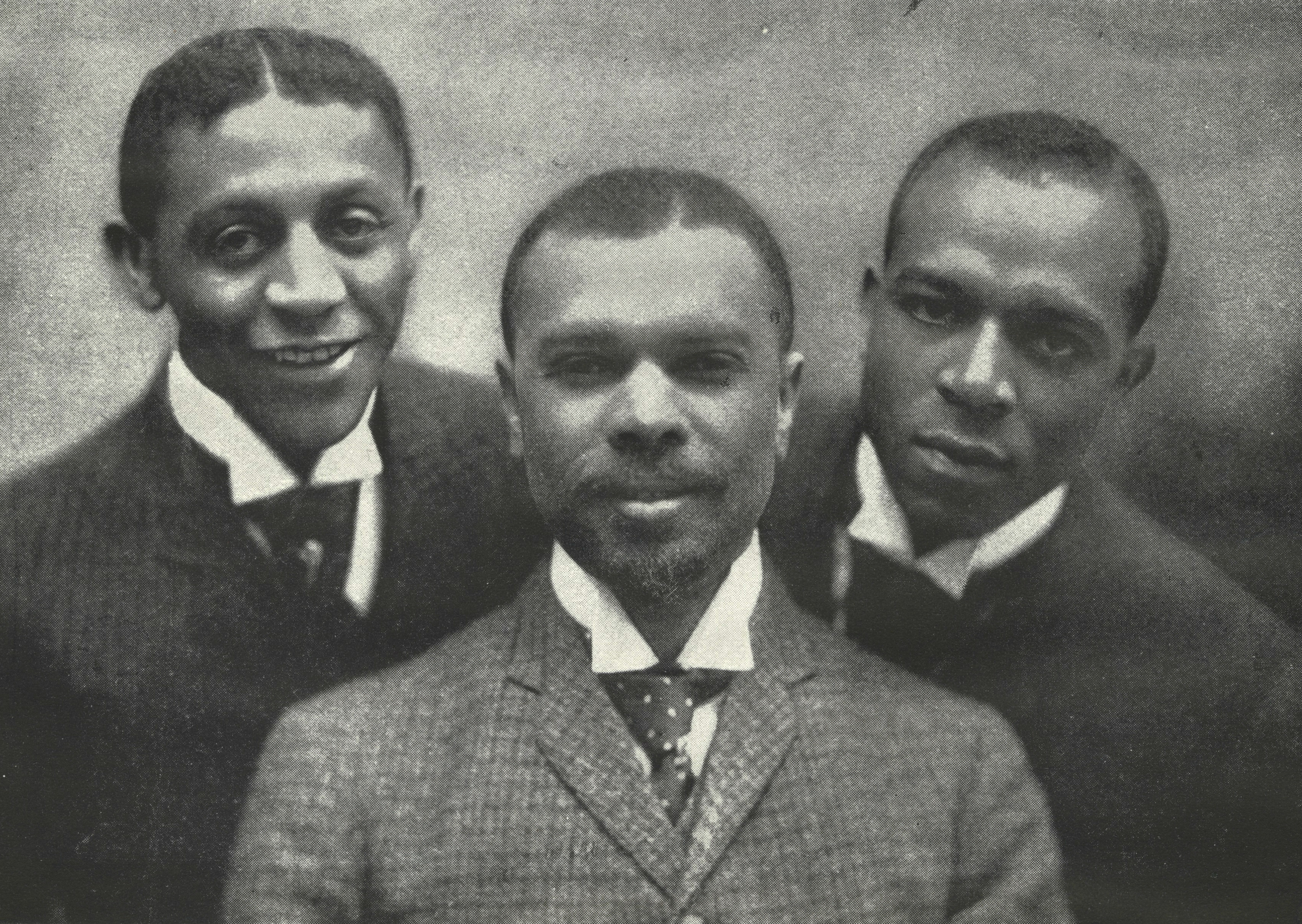
Cole, Johnson and Johnson

In 1899, Cole met two brothers from Jacksonville, Florida. who paved the path of the rest of his career in show business: his partnership with James Weldon and J. Rosamond Johnson, especially J. R. Johnson, lasted until his retirement in 1911. As Thomas L. Riis claimed, Cole's "association with the Johnson brothers indicated that Cole was turning away from coon-song composition" (140). There was little evidence as to the reason behind Cole's drastic shift from traditional "coon songs"; one possible reason was that Cole wanted to draw the elite audience into his plays. He averted from his normal Willy Wayward persona and adopted a more dignified and respectable character. It is possible that his transition was influenced by his partners, who both held college degrees, and his own political notions at the time. As a result, the cooperation of the two (Cole and Johnson) led to the creation of high-class vaudeville acts that incorporated elegance and sophistication, all of which were executed in evening dresses.

One can perceive that Cole was engaged in the political and societal issues of the time, indicated by his image-altering transition into creating shows for the elite. Furthermore, his interest in black politics was revealed from his scrapbook, which was not bursting with newspaper clippings of his own success in black show business, but rather, it consisted mainly of clippings from the Waller Affair. The Waller Affair involved the imprisonment of John L. Waller as a consequence of political confrontations between Madagascar and France, in which French imperialists who claimed to protect Madagascar did not support black developers. The French court-martial accused Waller of leaking information to the enemy (Madagascar) during the war, and sentenced Waller to twenty years imprisonment. Cole identified with Waller; they were both activists who protested against African-American inequities and believed in aiding their own kin. Although exteriorly, Cole appeared to be a carefree showman whose only purpose was to be famous in black minstrelsy and vaudeville plays, he organized his shows very meticulously and placed much thought in every detail and aspect of his productions. For example, he considered the exact timing of his songs, including the right execution of each part of the performance.

Several of the songs composed by the adjoining Cole-Johnson team were incorporated into larger shows by Klaw and Erlanger. Klaw and Erlanger's shows appealed the white audiences, allowing the black composers' songs to be known throughout the white community. Furthermore, focusing on the sophistication of the songs in comparison to earlier works, the lyrics avoided the stereotypical descriptions of the aggressive black man; instead, the lyrics provided a sentimental, romantic, and even melancholic atmosphere. Also, deviating from the traditional "coon songs", the humor in Cole and Johnson's works was more humane – it did not include the usual racial commentaries and African-American stereotyping. In general, their shows were more sophisticated and focused primarily on grasping the interests of the elite class. The success of their songs originated from the talents of both respective partners: Rosamond Johnson bore the advanced musical training and keyboard skills, whereas Cole bore the innovative talents in writing new pieces. It could be said that their partnership altered the path of black entertainment and subsequently moved the audience's interests towards a more refined type of black music. Not only did Cole and Johnson change the audience's taste in black music, they also attempted to educate the public through their songs and tried to prevent the regression towards the degrading "coon songs".

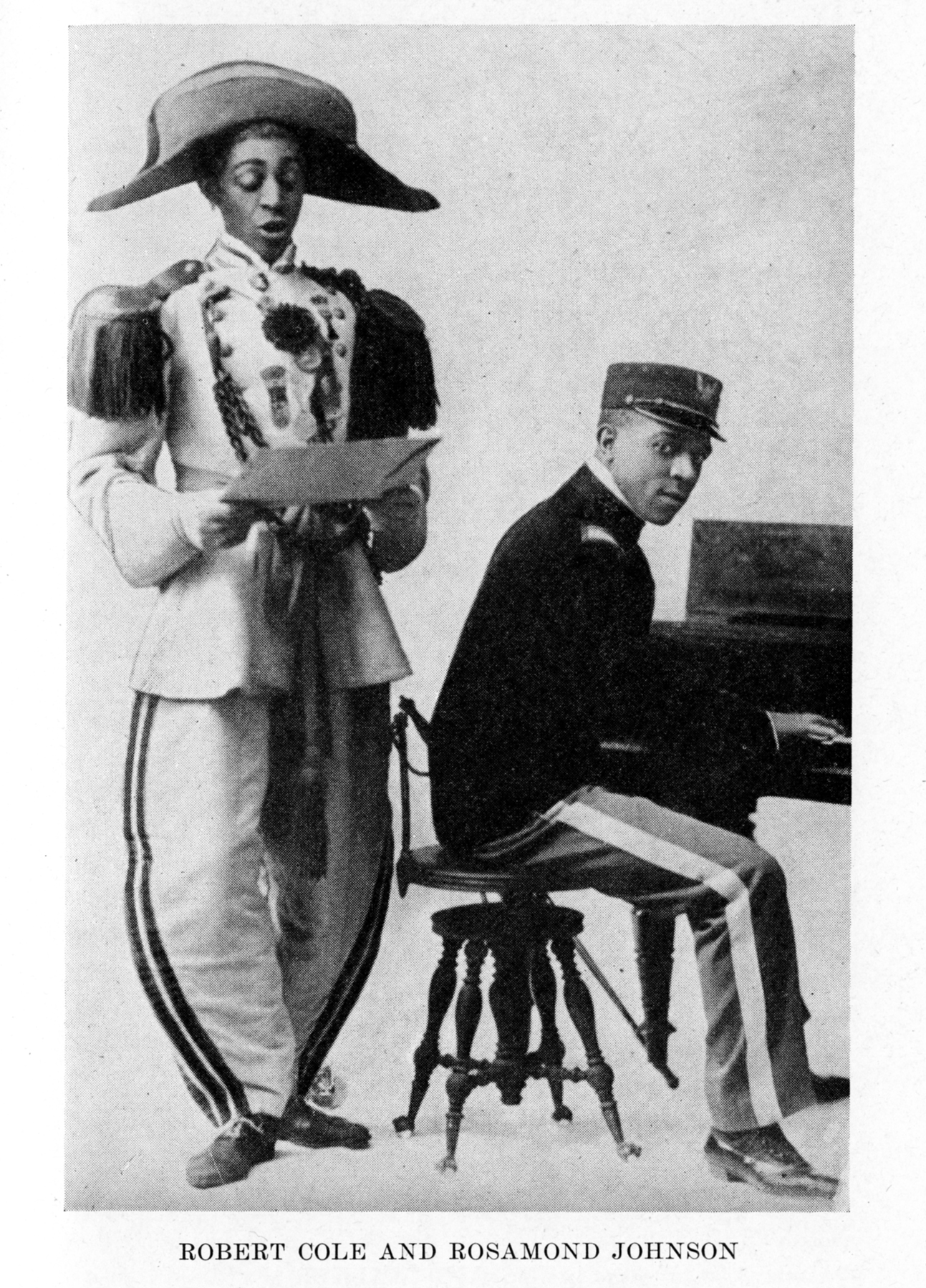
Robert Cole and Rosamond Johnson

== View on 20th-century Black entertainment and contributions ==
By 1902, Cole gained ultimate financial success, and wrote the article The Negro and the Stage for The Colored American Magazine. In it, he revealed his concerns toward the crippling image placed on African-American performers; for instance, he criticized the use of the African-American villains in black entertainment, for it demeaned African Americans and fueled the racist stereotype of the violent black man. He also denounced adaptations of Uncle Tom's Cabin that used African-American stereotypes.

Although he criticized the conventional use of the aggressive black man in most black entertainment of the day, arguing that it enforced a disreputable image on the black actors themselves, he ended the article by envisioning a bright future for black performers, where stereotyping and racism would be nullified, and African Americans would revolutionize the entertainment world.

Cole was a revolutionary figure who contributed to the movement in eliminating the degrading, social characterizations of the black performer, thus, forcing the path of black entertainment towards a more respectable and dignified future.

== See also ==
- African American musical theater
- Black Vaudeville
