= Pekin Theatre =

Former black-owned theatre in Chicago

Coordinates: 41°50′39.1″N 87°37′37.5″W

- Temple of Music; The New Pekin
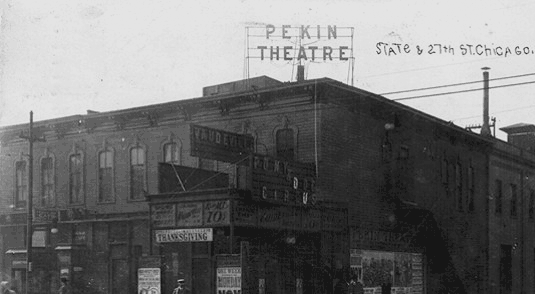
- Interactive map of Pekin Theatre
- Address: 2700 State Street; Chicago, Illinois; United States
- Capacity: 1200
- Type: Black-owned theatre
- Events: Musical theatre, vaudeville

Construction
- Opened: 18 June 1904
- Renovated: 1906
- Closed: After 1920
- Demolished: 1946

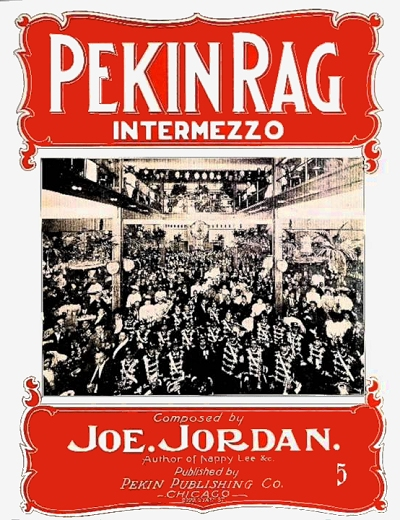
"Pekin Rag" was written by Joe Jordan, to celebrate Robert T Motts' Pekin Club, in Chicago. The club soon became the ground-breaking, African American Pekin Theatre

The Pekin Theatre was a theater established on June 18, 1904, in Chicago, Illinois, United States. It was the first black owned musical and vaudeville stock theatre in the United States. Between 1904 and around 1915, the Pekin Club and its Pekin Theatre served as a training ground and showcase for Black theatrical talent, vaudeville acts, and musical comedies. Additionally, the theatre allowed “African-American theatre artists with an opportunity to master theater craft and contribute significantly to the development of an emerging Black theater tradition”. It was known by various names.

The Pekin became "renowned for its all-black stock company and school for actors, an orchestra able to play ragtime and opera with equal brilliance, and a repertoire of original musical comedies." Robert T Motts, founded the theatre, and brought it to prominence by presenting an all black company, seeking out an affluent interracial audience, and using his establishment for social causes. Mott died in 1911, and after that the theater faded but he had established a new pattern of successful black enterprise.

== History ==
Following a 1901 trip to France and the Parisian music hall, "Cafe Chantants", Robert T. Motts, a Chicago saloon keeper and gambling king was inspired to "make a contribution to his race by providing entertainment along more cultural and uplifting lines". In 1904, he converted his Pekin saloon and restaurant, located at the corner of 27th and State Street, into the Pekin Theatre “Temple of Music”. Following a fire in 1906, Motts renovated the entire building, increasing the capacity from 400 to 1200, including box and lodge seating. With its own “stock company of colored artists, original musical comedies, farces, and plays written and composed by colored men", the ‘New Pekin Theatre’ re-opened on March 31, 1906, with the first production of the musical The Man from 'Bam.

Hiring a collection of "talented and experienced group of theatre operatives" including Charles Sager as stage manager, J. Ed Green as producing director, and Joe Jordan as the resident director of music, Motts' Pekin Theatre became the "only theatre in America playing colored artists exclusively", at a time when "most whites believed that Blacks possessed little or no skill in theater management". In all the Pekin Theatre's all African-American staff of 18 included a press agent, a treasurer, and a house physician, as well as its acting troupe, the Pekin Stock Co., with 34 members.

Motts charged no admission, instead making profits on the drinks sold during performances.

The Pekin became an anchor is the Bronzeville district known as "the Stroll". By 1910, there were over 53 Black-owned and operated Theatres across the United States, including seven theatres named after Robert T. Motts' New Pekin Theatre. One example is the Old Crown Theatre in Boston, which renamed to the Pekin after Edward C. Price converted to a nickelodeon.

=== Decline ===
Despite a decline in the overall interest in vaudeville and stock theatre, and a rise in the competition from films, nickel shows, and white-owned theaters in Bronzeville, Chicago, the Pekin continued thrive under Motts' ownership until his death in 1911. According to J. Hockley Smiley of the Chicago Defender, "no other funeral in the memory of the writer has brought out such a vast crowd of people as that of Mr. Motts". Following his demise, the Pekin remained in the Motts' estate before being sold to various owners over the next decade, never fully reclaiming its prominent position.

W.P. Shaver installed two movie projectors for the venue's relaunch on January 31, 1912. Films such as The Railroad Porter played when live plays were not scheduled, until 1915. During the World War I era, In 1917, the venue was converted to a dance hall with jazz musicians such as King Oliver. It eventually became the Pekin In Third District police station and jail. In 1946, the building was razed for a Southside housing project. The site is now parking lots and the Dearborn Homes.

== Notable performers ==
Numerous actors, playwrights, and directors to contributed to The Pekin's popularity. Motts selected the performers and did not allow obscenity or vulgarity in the performances. Many of the performers who got their break at The Pekin later became headliners.

- Charles Sidney Gilpin
- Jesse A. Shipp
- Harrison Stewart
- Lottie Grady
- J. Ed Green
- Lillyn Brown
- Miller and Lyles
- Andrew Tribble
- Aida Overton Walker

Booker T. Washington attended performances and delivered a speech from the stage of the Pekin Theatre.

== Legacy ==
In 2017, a one-night revival performance "An Evening at the Pekin Theatre” was presented by the Illinois Humanities Council and featured MacArthur-awarded ragtime player Reginald Robinson. Chicago historian Tim Samuelson also conducted walking tours of the Stroll.

== See also ==
- African Grove Theatre, an African American-owned live company specializing in drama in 1820s New York City
