= Billy McClain =

American actor

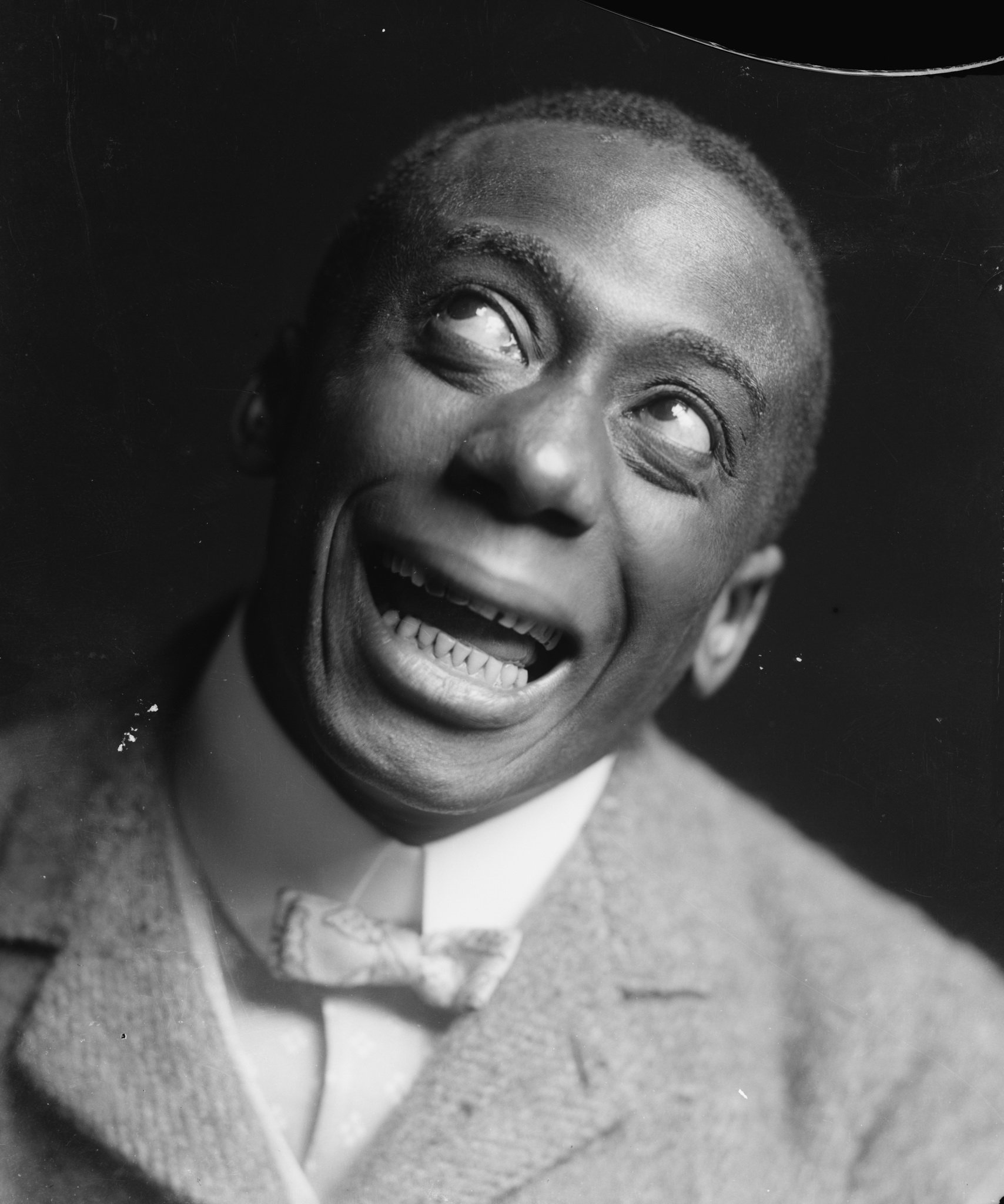
- McClain circa 1902
- Born: 12 October 1866; Indianapolis, Indiana, US
- Died: 19 January 1950 (aged 83); Los Angeles, California, US
- Occupation: Actor
- Years active: 1933–1950

William C. McClain (12 October 1866 – 19 January 1950) was an African-American acrobat, comedian and actor who starred in minstrel shows before World War I. He wrote, produced and directed several major stage and outdoor extravaganzas, and wrote a number of popular songs. He was influential in extending the range of minstrel shows far beyond the traditional conventions of the time, giving them appeal to much wider audiences. He toured in the United States, Canada, Australia and Europe. Later he promoted boxing and played several minor roles in movies.

== Life ==
=== Early years ===
William C. McClain was born on Elm Street in Indianapolis, Indiana, on 12 October 1866. He played cornet in Bell's Band when he was a boy, appearing in public for the first time in 1881 at Crone's Garden. In 1883 he joined Lew Johnson's Minstrels, then moved to Heck and Sawyer's Minstrels and then Blythe's Georgia Minstrels. McClain joined Sells Brothers' and Forepaugh's Circus in 1886 for a tour of the Hawaiian islands. He was the first black player with the circus. In 1887 he was with the Gigantic Comedy company.

McClain recalled playing with Cleveland's Minstrels at the Gaiety Theater in Kansas City in 1887. In that show he and Tom Brown were the first to do a sketch of a Chinaman and a "coon". He played with Cleveland's Minstrels in 1890, and toured with this company in the United States and Canada in 1891. On 10 January 1891 McClain was performing with Cleveland's Colored Minstrels in San Francisco when he fell from his trapeze and had three teeth knocked out. In 1892 McClain trained as a boxer.

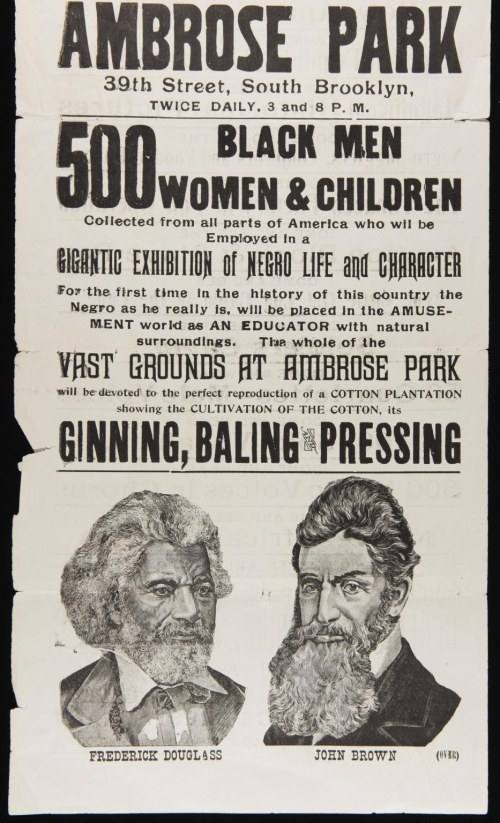
1895 poster for the Gigantic Exhibition of Negro Life and Character in Brooklyn

Early in the 1890s McClain and his wife Cordelia joined the Hyers Sisters Company. In 1892 the couple joined the extravaganza South Before the War, in which McClain was stage manager and the leading black comedian. The show was exceptional for the time in being mixed-race. McClain claimed to be the first to put a cake walk on the stage, in South before the War. Around then McClain was star of Suwanee River, an otherwise all-white show. In the summer of 1893 McClain directed the black performers in a spectacular reenactment of the American Civil War Siege of Vicksburg, which was staged outdoors on Manhattan Beach in Coney Island. In 1894 the McClains joined On the Mississippi, a Southern comic melodrama produced by Davis and Keough.

=== Producer and manager ===
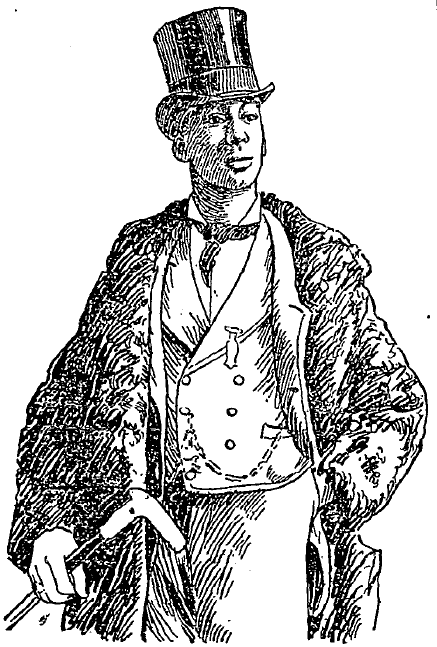
Billy McClain in 1895, from The New York Times review of Black America

McClain was hired in 1895 by Nate Salsbury to produce a show called Black America. Salsbury presented the show as educational, to help people understand the colored man. Promotional material said the "Scenes of rural simplicity" portrayed the "lovable, bright side of the true southern negro." The show was put on outdoors in Brooklyn, Boston, Manhattan, Philadelphia and Washington, D.C. There was a cast of 500 black people. It included replicas of cabins in a plantation village, music that included a huge choir of 300, dancing and novelty acts. The Ninth Cavalry Band of the US Army, which consisted of black musicians, played in Black America. In the finale of the show, the mass choir sang several tunes to giant portraits of white Union patriots such as John Brown, William Tecumseh Sherman, Ulysses S. Grant and Abraham Lincoln, and of the black patriot Frederick Douglass.

Although billed only as music director, McClain probably created and directed the show, which carries forward elements of much of his earlier work, particularly his script Before and After the War. McClain claimed credit, and his contemporary Tom Fletcher gave him credit. His wife, Cordelia, performed as a soloist. Cordelia McClain had trained as an actress under Billy McClain in Indianapolis. Later she became a stage manager and producer. In a 2 June 1895 report on the Brooklyn show titled "Fun for the Darkies" The New York Times identified Billy and Cordelia McClain as the aristocracy of Ambrose Park. Billy McClain was simply called the leader of the choruses. The show, presenting "Real Blacks from the Southern Plantations", was perhaps commercial and vulgar but showed the potential for upward mobility of African Americans.

Billy McClain starred in A.G. Field's Darkest America, and led the company in a tour of regular theatrical circuits. The show included songs, dances and sketches, and depicted African American life from the plantation up to modern times. A review in the 11 November 1896 Colored American of Washington D.C. praised the show, full of "clean, bright and wholesome fun". Another reviewer said the "delineation of Negro life, carrying the race through all their historical phases from the plantation, into the reconstruction days and finally painting our people as they are today, cultured and accomplished in social graces, holds the mirror faithfully up to nature." Billy and Cordelia McClain also performed in Sam T. Jack's The Creole Show, less a traditional minstrel show than a vaudeville revue.

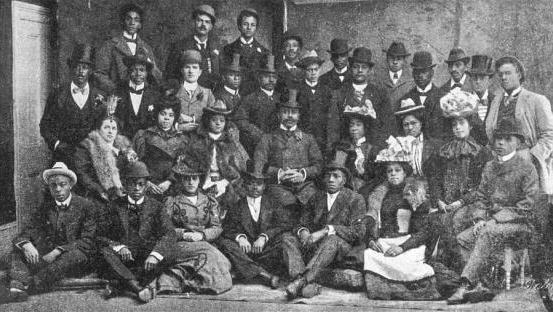
Orpheus McAdoo's Georgia Minstrels in Australia in January 1900

In 1899 McClain and his wife Cordelia joined M.B. Curtis's All-star American Minstrels on an Australian tour. Ernest Hogan, another singer-dancer-comedian, also appeared in this show. The company sailed for Sydney on 1 June 1899. Curtis abandoned the show soon after it arrived, and Hogan took over. The McClains transferred to Orpheus McAdoo's Georgia Minstrels, and stayed on in Australia after this company went back to the US. In January 1900 McClain was playing in the Opera House, Brisbane, Australia, with the O.M. McAdoo Georgia Minstrels. A reviewer said "The two low comedians of the company−"Billy" McClain and C.W. Walker−had their hearers in fits of laughter throughout the evening, their reappearance on the stage after their turns in the first part being always the signal for fresh outbursts of mirth. Before the interval ballads were well rendered by Madame Cordelia... While in Australia McClain acted as manager for the Australian black boxing contender Peter Felix.

After returning to the USA McClain appeared in Gus Hill's Smart Set company, which starred performers such as Ernest Hogan, Tom McIntosh and Sherman H. Dudley. The troupe staged vaudeville-style shows with comedy sketches, songs, dances and specialty acts. McCain and Hogan put together the original show. McCain contributed to a Smart Set musical comedy called Southern Enchantment. A review of a performance at the Empire Theatre in Newark, New Jersey on 13 October 1902 said, "The advent of a new darky sensation, the like of which our eyes have never seen before, greets the world. The Smart Set is the smartest set of colored people ever put together, on one stage in America..." A March 1903 review said "In many respects the show was a notable departure from the exhibitions of the past, in that it sought to put a better front to Negro life." In September 1903 the Smart Set opened its second season in Boston. McCain was stage manager but Tom McIntosh replaced Hogan as George Washington Bullion.

On 14 May 1904 the Indianapolis Freeman reproduced a review published by the St. Louis Star which said,

The attraction at Crawford's Theater this week contains some features somewhat out of the ordinary as theatrical features generally go. A remarkable achievement is Billy McClain's rendition of old 'Uncle Tom' in the play there this week. He has earned the title of being the foremost colored actor on the stage today. So long he has been identified with comedy and minstrelsy that it will seem incredible to the public to learn of him playing 'Svengali' in Trilby and 'Uncle Tom' in Uncle Tom's Cabin for 11 consecutive months with McKee, Rankin, and Nancy O'Neil in their stock company in Australia six years ago.

In 1904 J. Edward Green succeeded McClain as stage manager and producer of the Smart Set. Gus Hill's Smart Set put on the touring show The Black Politician, a musical comedy, in 1904-08. Music and lyrics were by James Reese Europe and Cecil Mack. It starred Jim Burris, Tom Logan and Irvin Allen. Billy McClain wrote and performed in the play.

=== Later career ===
McClain lived in Paris, France, from 1906 to 1913. He played in London and Paris in 1906 with Fred Karno's comedy troupe. They put on a popular show at the Casino de Paris and then moved to the Folies Bergère. His wife also performed with the troupe, as did an unknown comedian named Charlie Chaplin. While in France McClain drove a 40 hp De Dion-Bouton from Paris to Monte Carlo in a record time for touring cars. Writing from Paris in April 1910, McClain said he was the first Negro to produce, play, sing, dance and talk in French. In 1911 McClain was based in Brussels, Belgium, running a boxing school. McClain managed and trained the heavyweight boxer Sam McVey.

In 1931 McClain moved to Los Angeles and obtained a position with the Pasadena police department as a physical trainer. In August 1931 he appeared on stage for the first time in 21 years in a benefit performance, playing the two leading roles from Uncle Tom - Uncle Tom himself and the slave owner Simon Legree. While working for the police department he acted in several films. These included Nagana (1933), starring Melvyn Douglas, the short Rhapsody in Black, where he sang four "southern melodies", and Dimples, starring Shirley Temple. Between 1933 and 1946 McClain appeared in many other film roles, although often these were minor parts and he was not credited. He played a servant, butler, footman, cook and janitor. His last role was as "Uncle Ben" in Vincente Minnelli's suspense drama Undercurrent (1946). His name was misspelled in the end credits as "McLain."

Billy McClain died on 19 January 1950 when the trailer he was sleeping in caught fire. McClain was one of the pioneers in introducing "vaudevillized minstrelsy", which opened a wider range of styles on the eve of the ragtime era. Despite his great ability, he was handicapped by prejudice against African Americans. Thus he was reportedly arrested in Kansas City in 1902 for the offense of "having too much jewelry for a colored man." He may have failed to change from his stage clothes to street clothes before leaving the theater. During his lifetime he neither claimed nor received full recognition for his achievements.

== Work ==
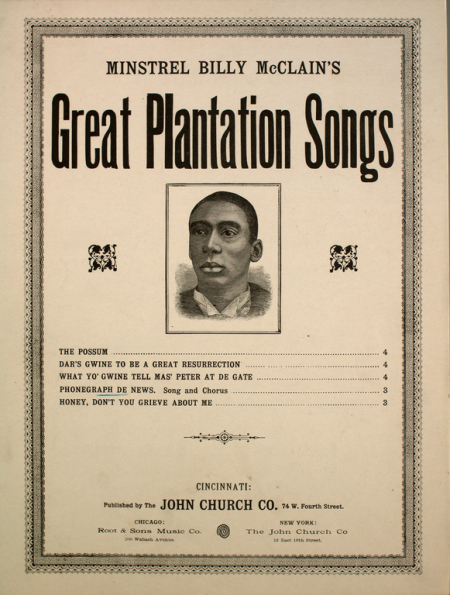
Sheet music cover c. 1910

=== Plays ===
Billy McClain wrote and performed in several plays, including:

- Down on the Swanee River
- Before and After the War
- From the Jungles to the Senate
- The Black Politician

=== Songs ===
Bill McClain wrote a number of popular songs:

- Pretty May
- Don't Forget Mother at Home
- Hand Down the Robe
- Dar's Gwine to Be a Great Resurrection
- Phonograph de News
- The Old School House
- Shake, Rattle and Roll (1897).

=== Film roles ===
Film roles included:

- 1933: Nagana - The King
- 1934: Black Moon Black House - Servant (uncredited)
- 1934: The World Moves On - Black Frenchman (uncredited)
- 1934: Name the Woman - Butler
- 1934: The Mighty Barnum - Barnum's Footman (uncredited)
- 1935: So Red the Rose - Servant in Kitchen (uncredited)
- 1935: Diamond Jim - Cook (uncredited)
- 1935: The Virginia Judge - Boy (uncredited)
- 1936: Anthony Adverse - Black Slave Being Whipped (uncredited)
- 1936: Down the Stretch - Uncle Lew (uncredited)
- 1936: Dimples - Rufus
- 1936: The Plainsman - Old Servant (uncredited)
- 1937: Saratoga - Butler (uncredited)
- 1937: Black Aces - Cook (uncredited)
- 1937: Boy of the Streets - Black preacher (uncredited)
- 1938: The Toy Wife - Black Orchestra Leader (uncredited)
- 1938: Angels with Dirty Faces - Janitor (uncredited)
- 1938: Kentucky Zeke - Zeke (uncredited)
- 1939: Devil's Island - Governor's Servant (uncredited)
- 1939: Espionage Agent - Manservant at Ball (uncredited)
- 1939: Pride of the Blue Grass - Black Groom (uncredited)
- 1946: Undercurrent - Uncle Ben (as Billy McLain)

== Sources ==
- Abbott, Lynn; Seroff, Doug (2003). Out of Sight: The Rise of African American Popular Music, 1889-1895. Univ. Press of Mississippi. ISBN 978-1-60473-039-5.
- Abbott, Lynn; Seroff, Doug (2009-09-17). Ragged But Right: Black Traveling Shows, Coon Songs, and the Dark Pathway to Blues and Jazz. Univ. Press of Mississippi. ISBN 978-1-60473-148-4.
- Batterson, Jack A. (1998). Blind Boone: Missouri's Ragtime Pioneer. University of Missouri Press. p. 6. ISBN 978-0-8262-1198-9.
- "Billy McClain". IMDb.
- Fiske, David (7 January 2014). "The Plantation in Brooklyn: Nate Salsbury's Black America Show".
- "Fun for the Darkies" (PDF). The New York Times. 2 June 1895.
- Jones, Reinette (2014). "McClain, William C. "Billy"". University of Kentucky Libraries.
- Peterson, Bernard L. Jr. (1993-10-25). A Century of Musicals in Black and White: An Encyclopedia of Musical Stage Works By, About, or Involving African Americans. ABC-CLIO. ISBN 978-0-313-06454-8.
- Peterson, Bernard L. (1997-01-01). The African American Theatre Directory, 1816-1960: A Comprehensive Guide to Early Black Theatre Organizations, Companies, Theatres, and Performing Groups. Greenwood Publishing Group. ISBN 978-0-313-29537-9.
- Tucker, Mark (Autumn 1993). "The Genesis of "Black, Brown and Beige"". Black Music Research Journal. 13 (2). Center for Black Music Research - Columbia College Chicago and University of Illinois Press: 67–86. doi:10.2307/779513. JSTOR 779513.
- Reed, Bill (2009-12-22). Hot from Harlem: Twelve African American Entertainers, 1890-1960. McFarland. ISBN 978-0-7864-5726-7.
- Sampson, Henry T. (2013-10-30). Blacks in Blackface: A Sourcebook on Early Black Musical Shows. Scarecrow Press. ISBN 978-0-8108-8351-2.
- "Undercurrent: Notes". Turner Classic Movies. Archived from the original on September 17, 2011.
- Webb, Barbara L. (Winter 2001). "The Black Dandyism of George Walker: A Case Study in Genealogical Method". TDR. 45 (4). The MIT Press: 7–24. doi:10.1162/105420401772990306. JSTOR 1146926. S2CID 57565953.
- Webb, Barbara L. (March 2004). "Authentic Possibilities: Plantation Performance of the 1890s". Theatre Journal. 1 (56). The Johns Hopkins University Press: 63–82. doi:10.1353/tj.2004.0037. JSTOR 25069378. S2CID 143447830.
