= McFadden's Flats =

McFadden's Flats may refer to:

- McFadden's Flats (1927 film), an American silent film
- McFadden's Flats (1935 film), an American comedy film
