= Griffin Sisters =

Duo of American vaudeville performers

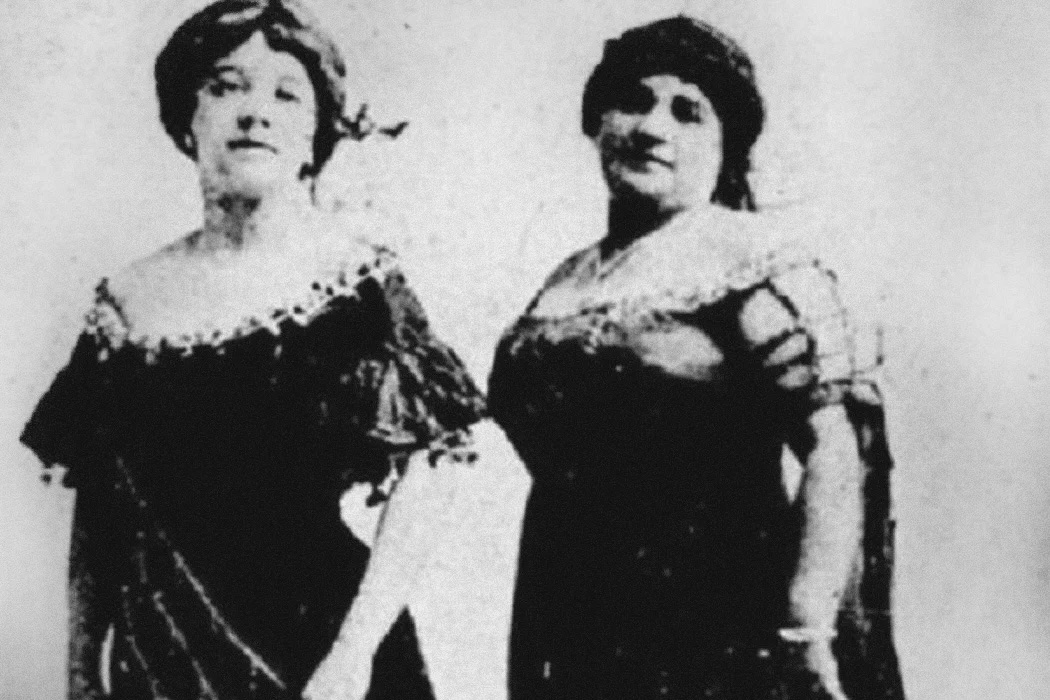
Mabel and Emma Griffin, aka The Griffin Sisters, African-American Vaudeville entertainers and entrepreneurs

The Griffin Sisters, Emma (1874–1918) and Mabel (1877–1918) Griffin, were American vaudeville performers in the late 1800s and early 1900s who became entrepreneurs and social activists and opened one of the first booking agencies owned by Black women. They publicly spoke out by demanding higher wages and better working conditions for Black performers at a time when discrimination and racism were both common in the entertainment industry.

== Early life ==
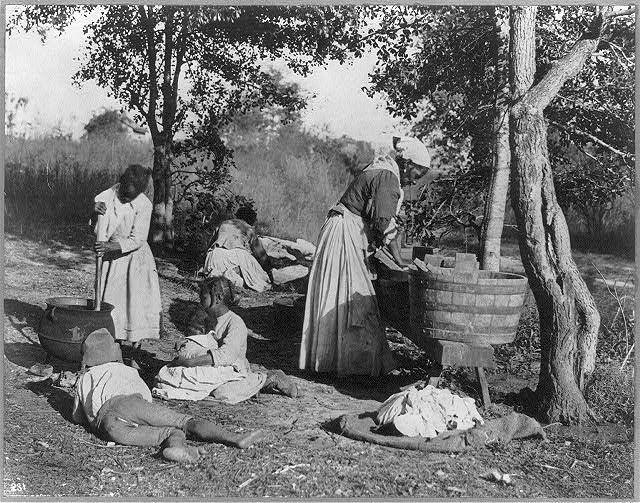
A woman and family doing laundry in 1900. Emma Griffin began her working life doing other people's laundry for $1.00-$1.50 per week.

The sisters were born in Louisville, Kentucky, Emma in 1874, and Mabel in 1877. Their mother, Blandina Montgomery Duncan, was a laundress who sometimes lived in other people's homes, their father Henry a laborer. They had two brothers, Henry and George. In 1894, Emma also began work doing laundry to earn extra income for the home. Average earnings for laundresses at that time was $1.00- $1.50 per week.

The Griffin children and their mother lived with their maternal grandparents, Mary and George Montgomery. Their grandfather worked as a hostler at George Linderberger's Livery Stable.

Emma and Mabel began singing in church, and studied music at Louisville's Black college, the Kentucky State Normal School. The family moved to Chicago in 1894, and the two young women got work performing at the recently opened Kohl and Middleton's Dime Museum.

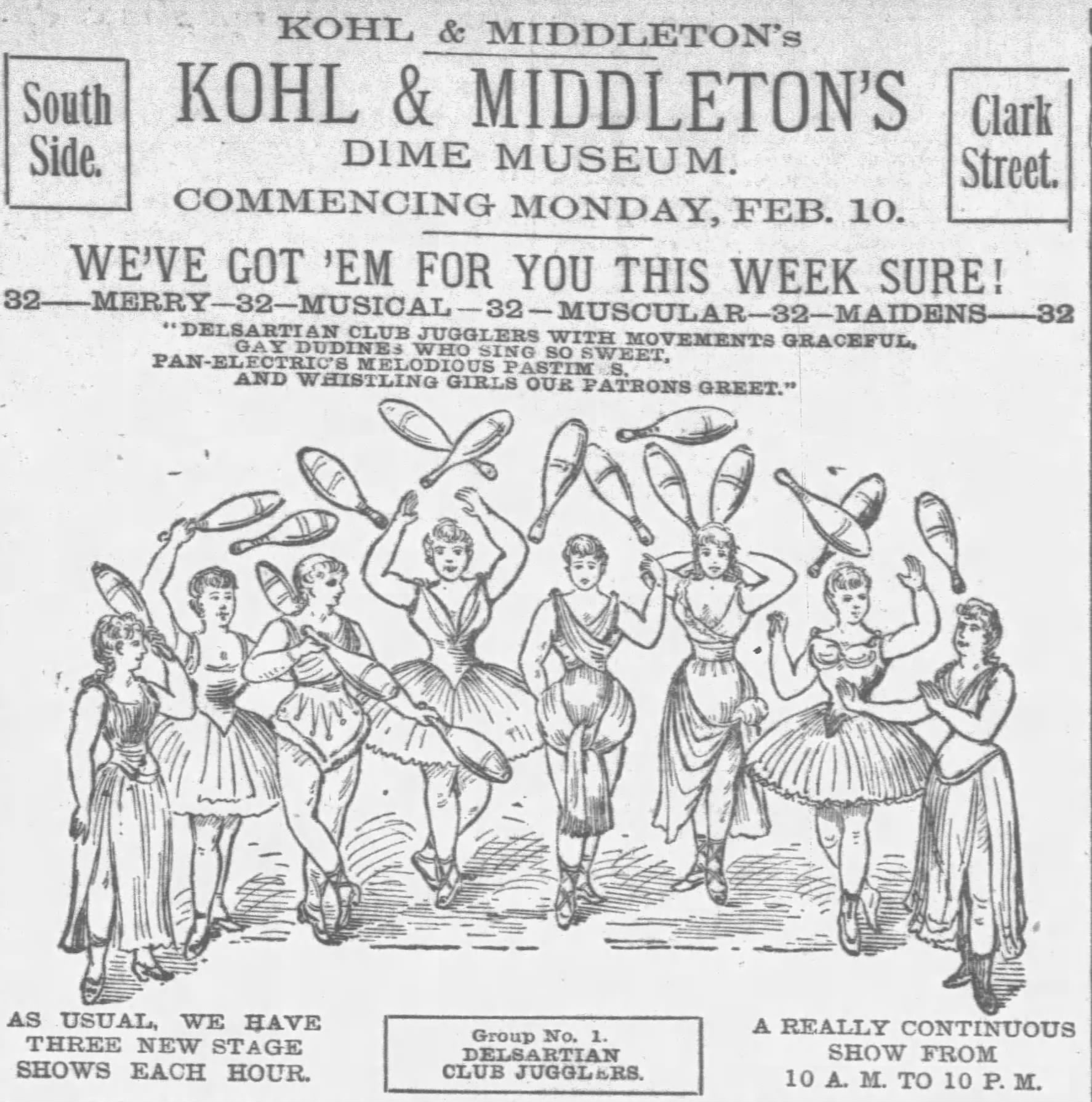
1890 Advertisement for Kohl and Middleton's Dime Museum in Chicago

Dime Museums, popularized by PT Barnum, combined 'human oddities' like conjoined twins or armless people with entertainment and beauty pageants of attractive women. Emma was described as darker skinned, shorter and 'more voluptuous'; Mabel was tall and svelte with 'hair slightly kinked and dyed a beautiful antique gold hue". Both sisters were relatively light skinned and able to present as 'racially ambiguous' although throughout their careers they declared their 'race pride' in being Black women. Typical of dime museum shows and vaudeville of that time, the sisters satisfied the desires of white audiences for 'the exotic other'. As talented singers, comedians and dancers, they acted as lures to draw audiences in to see the rest of the show.

== Vaudeville performers ==
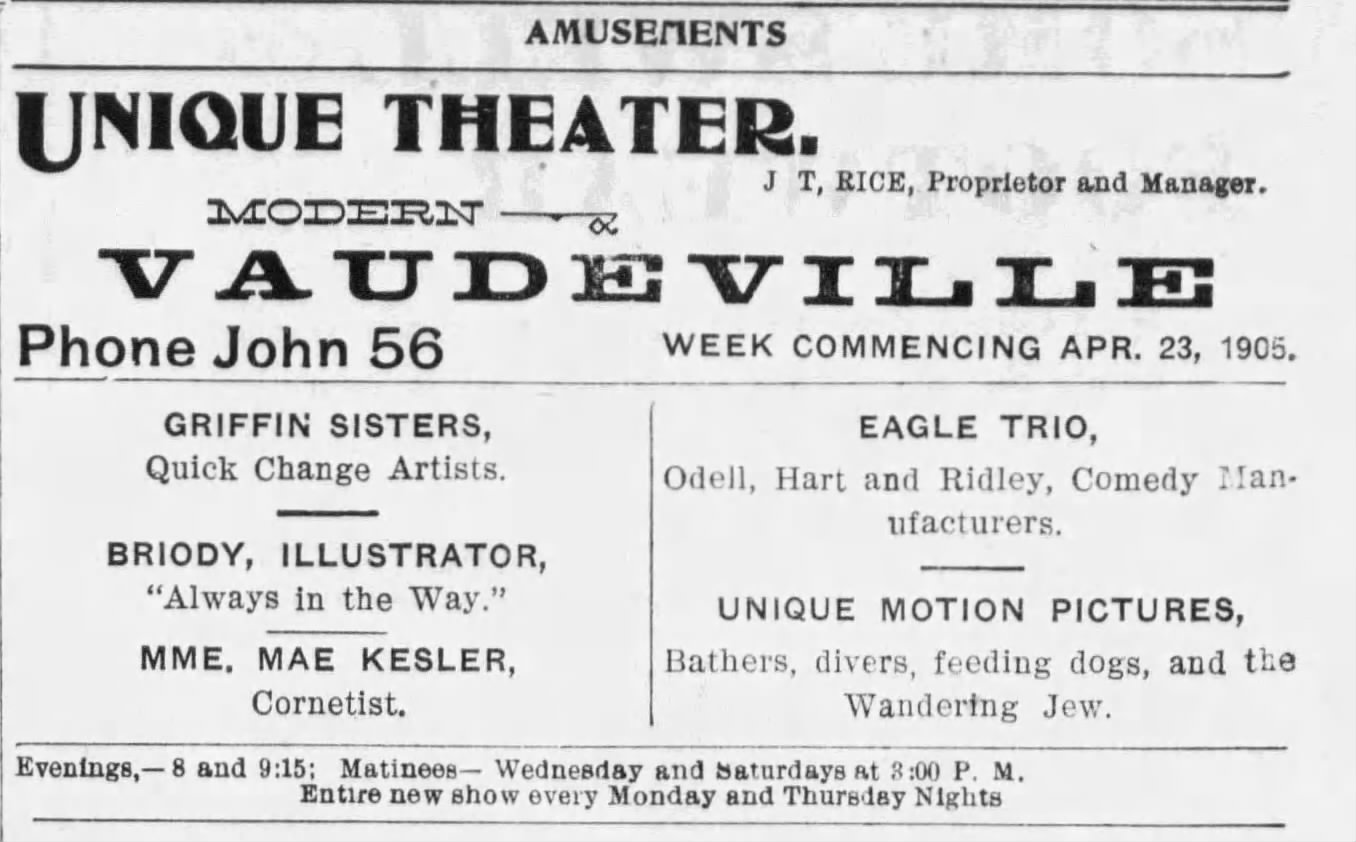
Ad in the Santa Cruz Surf April 24, 1905 for Griffin Sisters with other Vaudeville Acts at the Unique Theater in Santa Cruz CA

=== On the road ===
In 1895, Emma and Mabel were hired as chorus girls with John Isham's The Octaroons, a travelling vaudeville show of 50 Black and mixed-race performers. They worked with the Octaroons for two years. In 1898, they moved on to work as a duo with burlesque impresario Al Reeves.

When the sisters began their Vaudeville career, it was still unusual for Black women to work as performers. Ninety-two per cent of Black women in 1900 were either working in agriculture or as domestic laborers; there were only 262 Black women in the U.S. who listed themselves on the census that year as entertainers. Black women were sometimes criticized in both the Black and white press for performing onstage, as it was looked upon as immoral.

In the early 1900s, the sisters began working for the Western Vaudeville Managers Association (WVMA), one of three major booking agencies. Considered 'real vaudeville' these agencies provided more security and steady work for entertainers but took a substantial cut of performer's salaries.

Emma and Mabel, billed as "Character change artists" and "entrancing vocalists", performed all over the United States, including Alaska, earning from $50 to $100 per week. Like other Black performers, they did not earn as much as their white counterparts, and faced discrimination in lodging, travel and bookings.

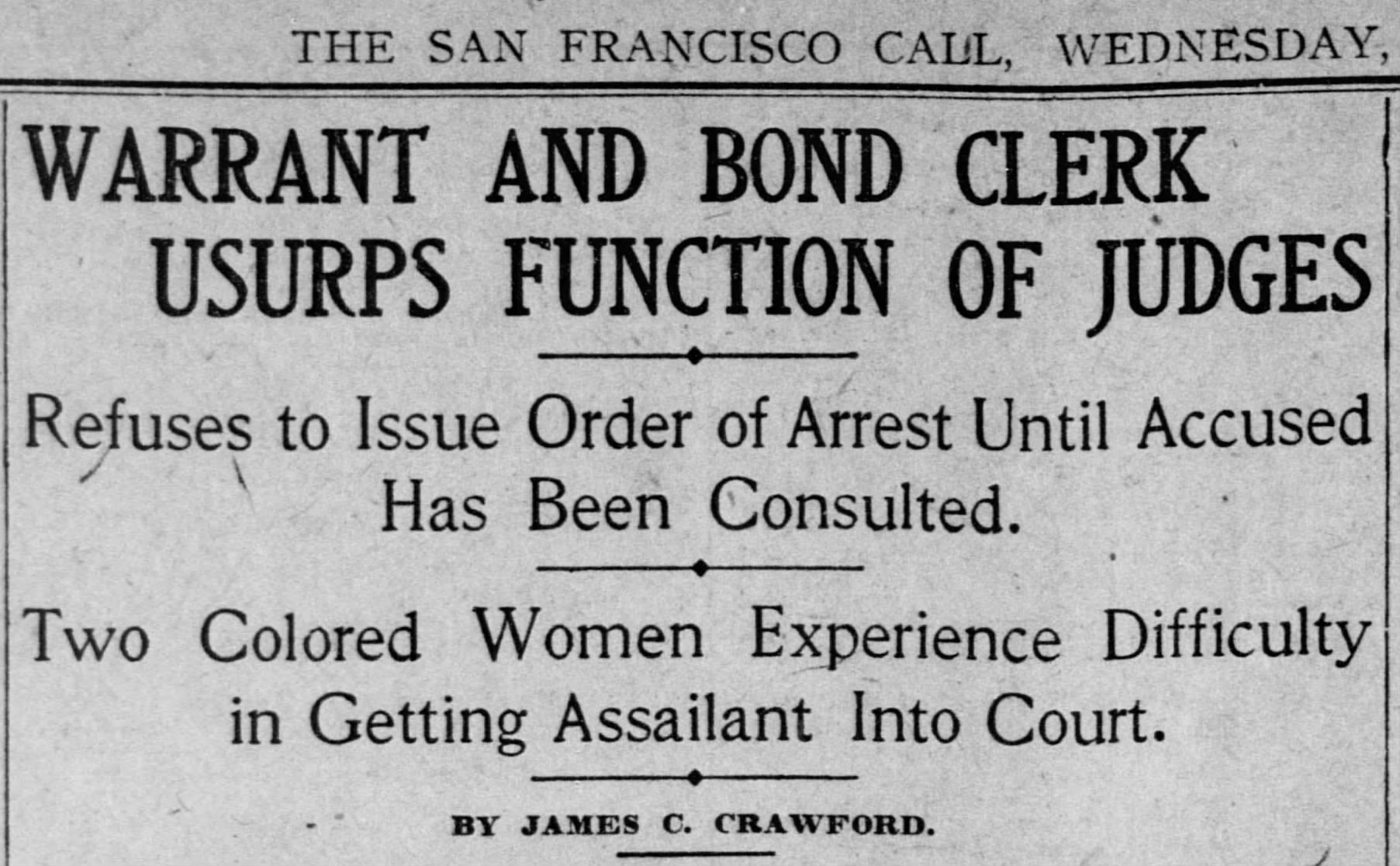
A 1906 article about the Griffin Sisters' efforts to get justice exposed discrimination and corruption in San Francisco

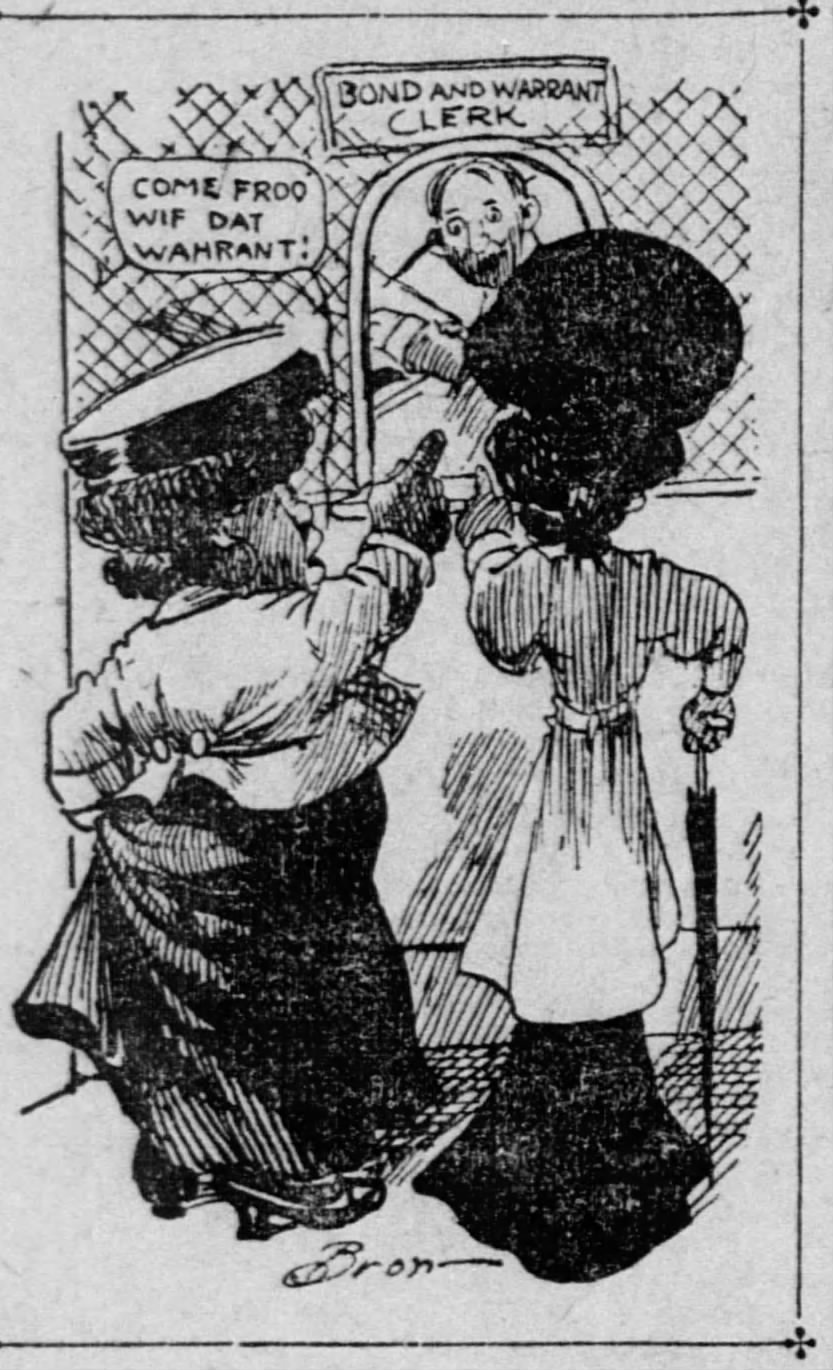
1906 San Francisco Call and Post Cartoon of Vaudeville entertainers the Griffin Sisters trying to get justice

The sisters, especially Emma, used the press and the courts to speak out about the treatment they received. In San Francisco in 1905, they filed suit against a white manager who fired them, alleging racial discrimination. The manager claimed he let them go because their act was poor and contained 'objectional content.' The following year in the same city, they were attacked and physically ejected from a bar by the saloonkeeper because of their color; the San Francisco Call and Post covered the difficulties they had getting their case heard by a judge.

=== Chicago ===
In 1910, they moved back to Chicago as a home base and began performing primarily for Black audiences, writing their own material. They performed to rave reviews at the Monogram Theater, the Indianapolis Crown Garden and other venues. An audience favorite was an act in which they both crossdressed as men, Emma as President Taft and Mabel as his conversation partner. "The amazing thing about their work," wrote one reviewer, "is the originality and unlikeliness of all they do".

In her newspaper letters and interviews, Emma continued to speak out about the discrimination that black performers faced and the need for Black self-determination in entertainment.

“[Colored acts] are not wanted in white theaters," she said "and white agencies tell us to our faces that they cannot use us and on every side the doors are shut in our face. It is time that we pull together and work for ourselves and [let] the white man see that we can do it without him”.

When white 'coon shouters' approached her to learn how to better perform their songs, Emma turned them down, denouncing the white appropriation of Black culture in coon songs which were popular then and played off racist stereotypes of Black people.

"White men and women are browning up, blacking up and turning up, and our colored men are training them to do the colored people’s work” she said. "I, Miss Emma Griffin, have had many big time white women to ask me to teach them how to do a coon song as I do. They have offered me much money, but I have refused, for I never teach a white woman something to make [her] about six hundred dollars per week, when for the same thing, the white manager would not give me fifty dollars. Let us look at all these things which are killing us every day".

== Theatrical entrepreneurs ==
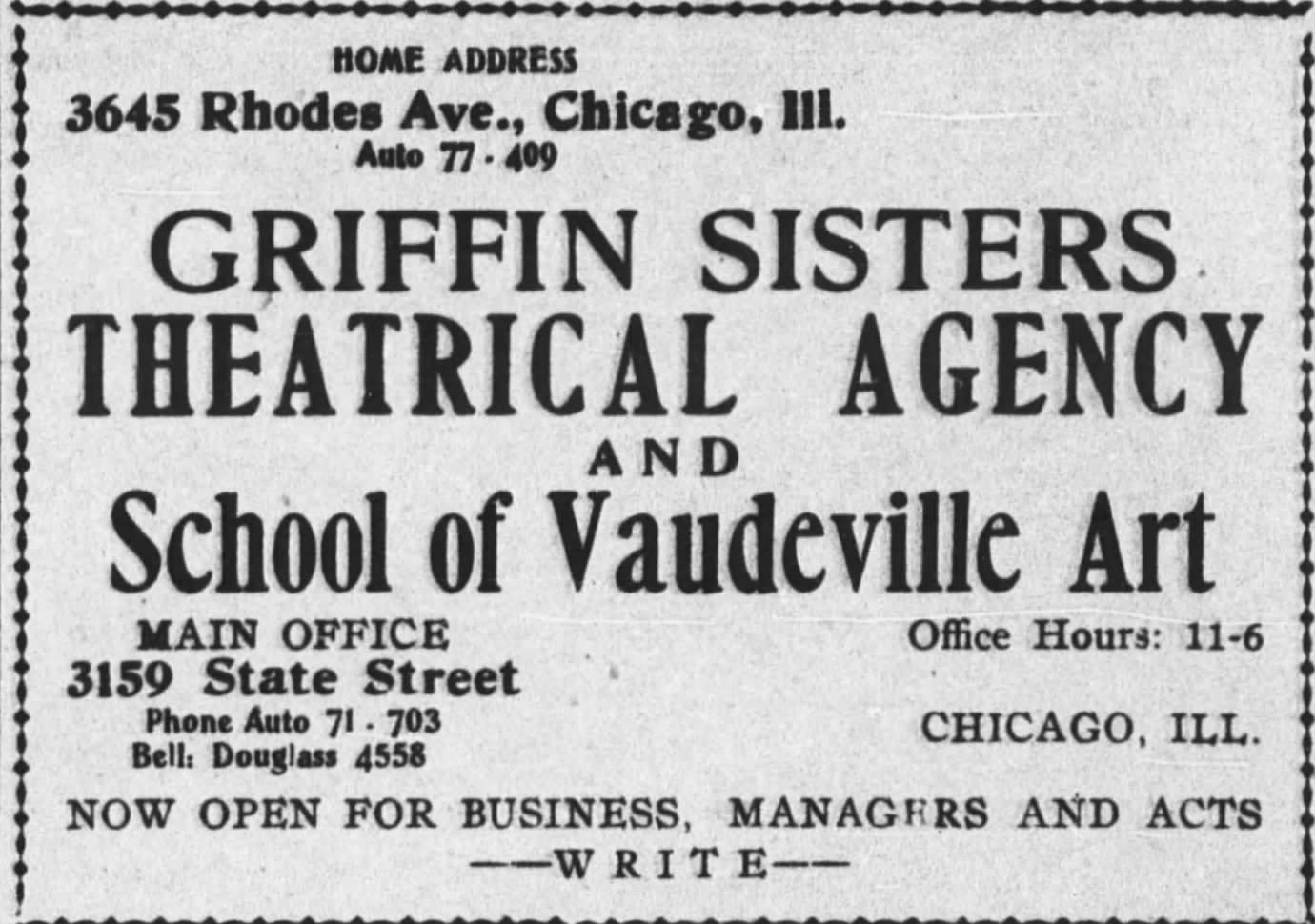
Jan 29 1914 New York Age Ad for Griffin Sisters Theatrical Employment Agency and Vaudeville School in Chicago

In 1913, they signed on as performers with an emerging Black theater owner/producer, Sherman H. Dudley, whose vaudeville circuit would later set the stage for the Theater Owners Booking Association (TOBA). With Dudley as an advisor, the Griffin Sisters Theatrical Agency opened in Chicago in December 1913 as the “first and only colored women’s theatrical booking agency in the United States”. The agency also offered training in vaudeville performance, negotiated for higher salaries for Black performers and found jobs for domestic workers and stagehands. The sisters called on Black investors to invest in their agency, set up a second residence in Washington DC, and networked within Black society there. They sublet theaters for the performances they managed, with plans for creating their own theater, the Air Dome.

Emma Griffin developed a reputation as "a figure that all managers of colored theaters, and booking agents will have to reckon with".

The sisters began management of the Alamon Theater in Indianapolis, Indiana, in April 1914, and the Majestic Theater in Washington, D.C. in June 1914. They also sublet the Pekin theater in Chicago and other theaters across the country to help establish their own vaudeville circuit.

As Black female entrepreneurs in Vaudeville, they joined a small group of other Black women entertainers and entrepreneurs who actively worked for higher pay, greater autonomy and better conditions, which included Sisieretta Jones and the Whitman sisters; these women supported each other and interacted socially at society events of Black leaders.

Soon, they were making enough money from their agency and their own performances to help support their family as well as donate to social organizations in Washington and Chicago. In 1914–15, they earned the 21st century equivalent of approximately $200,000 per year.

== Personal life ==
The sisters remained unmarried and without children throughout their lives. Historian Michelle R. Scott noted that although this gave their audiences the illusion that they were 'romantically available, it also allowed them greater ability to control their lives. They kept a rented residence in Chicago, but used black newspapers The Chicago Defender and the Indianapolis Freeman as their mailing address. Throughout their career, they sent money home to their mother and grandmother.

== Later life and death ==
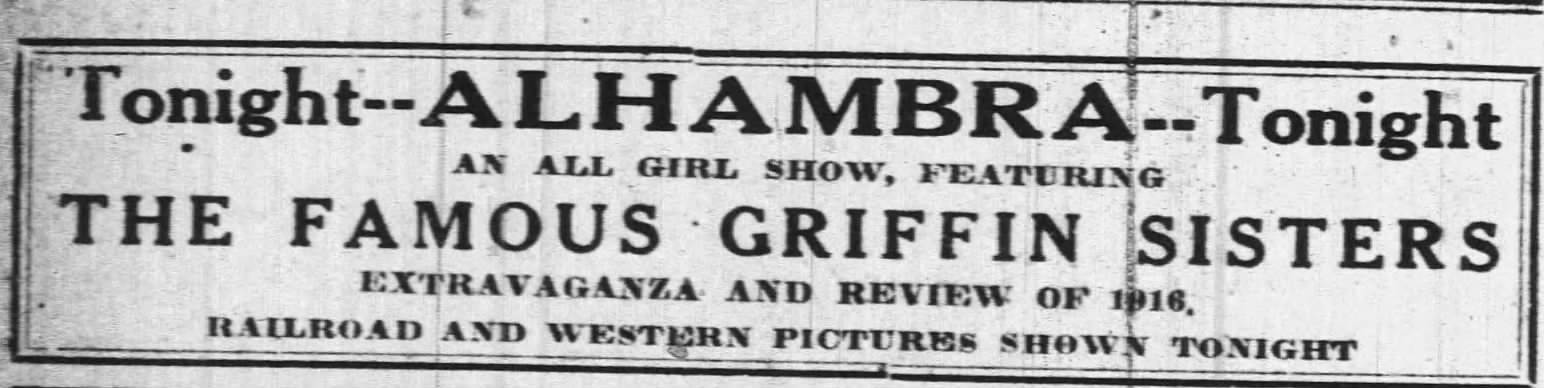
1916 New York Dispatch Ad for The Famous Griffin Sisters

The sisters suffered from respiratory problems throughout their career. In 1914, while performing onstage, Emma collapsed and spent a month in the hospital. In 1915, Mabel had a stroke. Mabel and Emma gave up their booking agency, formed a traveling company with other women and went back on the road to help pay back their investors. They continued to receive rave reviews. But their health kept failing and medical and housing costs rose. In 1918, Black Chicago society hosted a benefit to raise money for them, attended by friends and luminaries like Mme CJ Walker, which was billed as 'the first benefit with moving pictures'. But Mabel became ill again, then 11 weeks later, on August 28, 1918, Emma died "in her sister's arms" of bronchitis.

Emma's obituary made the front page of The New York Age, where she was praised for her talent and her ability to make people laugh onstage, as well as for her activism in politics as a suffragette and her campaigns for better conditions for Black performers. She was buried in Lincoln Cemetery, Chicago. Existing sources do not mention Mabel's date of death or place of burial.

== Legacy ==
Historians have noted the importance of The Griffin Sisters as both performers and businesswomen. "Despite the dominance of white men in the American entertainment industry," wrote Michelle R. Scott, "the Griffin Sisters’ entrepreneurial efforts represent a monumental moment in Black female agency and business acumen in American vaudeville theater".

They set the stage for Black female entrepreneurs and performers who followed them including five women with TOBA who owned theaters. Their activism opened the gates for later celebrities like Bessie Smith and Ethel Waters, who continued to push for better conditions for Black performers.
