= Ted Greene (disambiguation) =

Ted or Theodore Greene may refer to:

- Ted Greene (1946-2005), American fingerstyle jazz guitarist
- Ted Greene (American football), American football player
- Theodore P. Greene (1809-1887), Rear admiral of the United States navy

== See also ==
- Ted Green (born 1940), Canadian professional ice hockey coach and player
- Theodore Green (disambiguation)
- Edward Greene (disambiguation)
