= Edward Greene =

Edward Greene may refer to:

- Ed Greene (fl. 1960s–1990s), American drummer and session musician
- Edward Greene (MP) (1815–1891), British political figure, member of Parliament for Bury St Edmunds, 1865–1881, and Stowmarket, 1886–1891
- Sir Edward Greene, 1st Baronet (1842–1920), British political figure, member of Parliament for Bury St Edmunds, 1900–1906
- Edward Lee Greene (1843–1915), American botanist, associated with the Smithsonian Institution
- Edward B. Greene (1878—1957), American banker, mining company executive.
- Edward L. Greene (1884–1952), American football player and coach of football and baseball
- Edward Greene (sport shooter) (1875–1957), American sport shooter
- Edward Burnaby Greene (c. 1735–1788), English landowner, poet and translator

== See also ==
- Edward Green (disambiguation)
- Ted Greene (disambiguation)
