= Gus Hill =

American vaudeville performer (1858–1937)

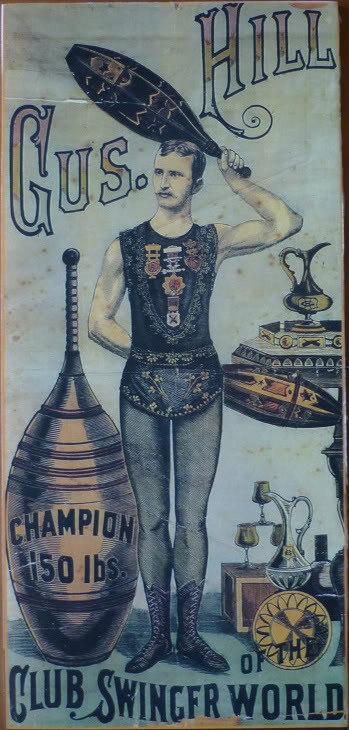
- Gus Hill circa 1880
- Born: Gustave Metz; 22 February 1858; New York City, New York, US
- Died: 20 April 1937 (aged 79); New York City, New York, US
- Occupation: Vaudeville entrepreneur
- Known for: Cartoon theatricals

Gus Hill (born Gustave Metz; 22 February 1858 – 20 April 1937) was an American vaudeville performer who juggled Indian clubs. He later became a burlesque and vaudeville entrepreneur. Hill was one of the founders of the Columbia Amusement Company, an association of burlesque shows and theaters, and became president of the American Burlesque Association. He also staged drama and musical comedies. He launched a highly popular series of "cartoon theatricals", musical comedies based on comic strips or cartoons. At one time he was running fourteen different shows.

== Early years ==
Gus Hill was born Gustave Metz in New York City on 22 February 1858. His parents, Gustave Metz and Martha E. Baecht Metz, were German immigrants. Gus was the oldest of three surviving boys. His father was the owner of a sawmill and furniture factory. Gus Hill was an amateur athlete. He became a wrestler and then a juggler with Indian clubs. He took the name "Hill" from a sporting resort at Broadway and Crosby Street in Manhattan called Harry Hill's. (Note: Another source say Hill first appeared at Harry Hill's Free and Easy on Broome Street and the Bowery.)

On 16 June 1876, when Hill was eighteen, he was listed as a club swinger on a bill for a vaudeville show at Tony Pastor's theater in New York. The show featured the "great Leonzo Brothers and their celebrated dog, Tiger." He would travel around the country challenging local jugglers to compete. On his first appearance he would let the local win. He would challenge them to a repeat match when he returned, ensuring a full house, and would then defeat the local. He gained the title of "Champion Clubman of the World". There was some sharp practice involved, but the title was useful in his variety act billings. (Note: Hill would invite members of the audience to try to lift his clubs, which were so heavy that few could do so. He then took the clubs on stage and juggled them effortlessly. Unseen, he had removed the lead weights from the false bottoms of the clubs.)

== Vaudeville manager ==
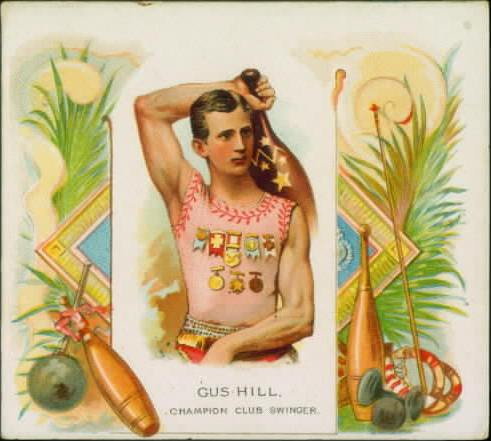
1888 sports card

Gus Hill soon moved into show business management, although he continued to perform for ten years or more. Hill produced Gus Hill's Mammoth Novelty Company in the 1885–86 season, and performed in the show with his Indian clubs. He produced Gus Hill's World of Novelties in the 1886–87 season, featuring the new performers Joe Weber and Lew Fields. Hill produced musical comedies priced low for unsophisticated audiences far from Broadway. The scenery was designed to fold up into specially designed trunks to save space. Hill was known for cost-cutting, using old scenery and costumes, and employing performers who could not demand high wages since they were not yet known, or were past their peak.

In 1892 Hill added a second company, Gus Hill's New York Vaudeville Stars. Hill would put on shows from Monday to Saturday each week, including Wednesday and Saturday matinees. Hill made all the travel arrangements. Typically the show moved to a new city by train on a Monday morning, and were put up at a boarding house for performers at their destination. Hill owned several of these boarding houses, as did other variety company owners. The cast would share rooms, and would be given their meals at the boarding house. This kept expenses down, but conditions were acceptable for the performers. Hill signed up David C. Montgomery & Fred Stone in May 1896. By this time he was one of the richest of the variety show promoters. A reviewer described Hill's show at the Haymarket Theater in Chicago in 1896:

The program for the week contains several features that are popular with lovers of vaudeville. It includes Fred Hallen and Molly Fuller, who appear in a singing sketch in which they introduce some novel and entertaining features; the American Macs; Frank Latona in a musical specialty; Annie Whitney in sentimental ballads and serio-comic songs; James Bingham, ventriloquist; Walter Reed, who gives a burlesque flying ring and trapeze performance; the Speck Brothers, comical midget boxers; and Montgomery and Stone, buck and wing dancers.

For the 1896–97 season Hill added three burlesque companies and the cartoon theatrical McFadden's Row of Flats. Gus Hill's Ideal Minstrels first appeared in 1898. (Note: The "Gus Hill's Minstrels" vaudeville theater was built around 1869 at 1890–1898 Park Avenue, Manhattan. The Gus Hill's Minstrels appeared on stage. Later it became a dance hall, gymnasium and fight arena.) That year he produced a series of melodramas written by Owen Davis. The next year he introduced the Royal Lilliputians, a freak show. He managed to poach Billy Reeves from Fred Karno's show to appear in his own Around the Clock vaudeville company. Eddie Cantor also played in his vaudeville shows.

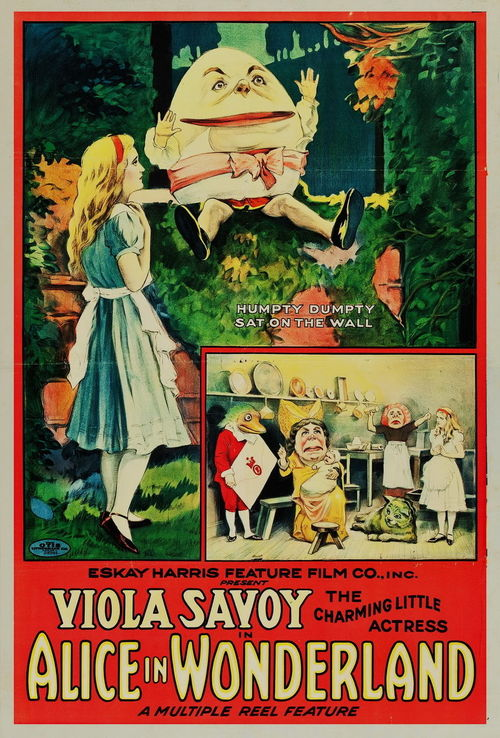
Poster for the 1915 film of Alice in Wonderland

== Burlesque and other enterprises ==
Gus Hill's Aggregation and Gus Hill's Stars were burlesque shows, but included variety acts and were cleaner than others. Gus Hill was one of sixteen producers who incorporated the Columbia Amusement Company on 12 July 1902. With the "Columbia Wheel" a series of companies followed each other round a circuit of theaters, a concept for which he claimed the credit. Hill produced three burlesque shows each season for Columbia until the early 1910s, when he leased his franchise to other producers so he could devote more time to Mutt and Jeff. The Columbia Wheel came to operate two large burlesque circuits after buying a rival. In May 1915 the company arranged to transfer its No. 2 circuit, which had forty theaters and thirty-four touring companies, to a new corporation called the American Burlesque Association. Gus Hill was named president of the new entity.

Hill funded a number of African American reviews. One of these was Gus Hill's Smart Set Company, which starred performers such as Billy McClain, Ernest Hogan, Tom McIntosh and Sherman H. Dudley. The troupe staged vaudeville-style shows with comedy sketches, songs, dances and specialty acts. Gus Hill's Smart Set put on the touring show The Black Politician, a musical comedy, in 1904–08. Music and lyrics were by James Reese Europe and Cecil Mack. It starred Jim Burris, Tom Logan and Irvin Allen. At this time Hill was running fourteen different shows. He had a mule which had appeared in McFadden Flats, and then was moved to other revues without success. Hill gave the mule to Dudley, who brought it on stage and created a sensation. Salem Tutt Whitney joined the Smart Set Company in 1905. In 1909 he and J. Homer Tutt organized the Whitney Musical Comedy Company, which toured under Hill's management as the Southern Smart Set Company.

Hill ventured into film production with the Nonpareil Feature Film Company in 1914. The first film released was the pseudo-documentary The Line Up at Police Headquarters. Hill announced plans to make a series of single-reel Happy Hooligan episodes, but none appeared. Nonpareil released a version of Alice in Wonderland, starring Viola Savoy. The company appears to have then quietly folded.

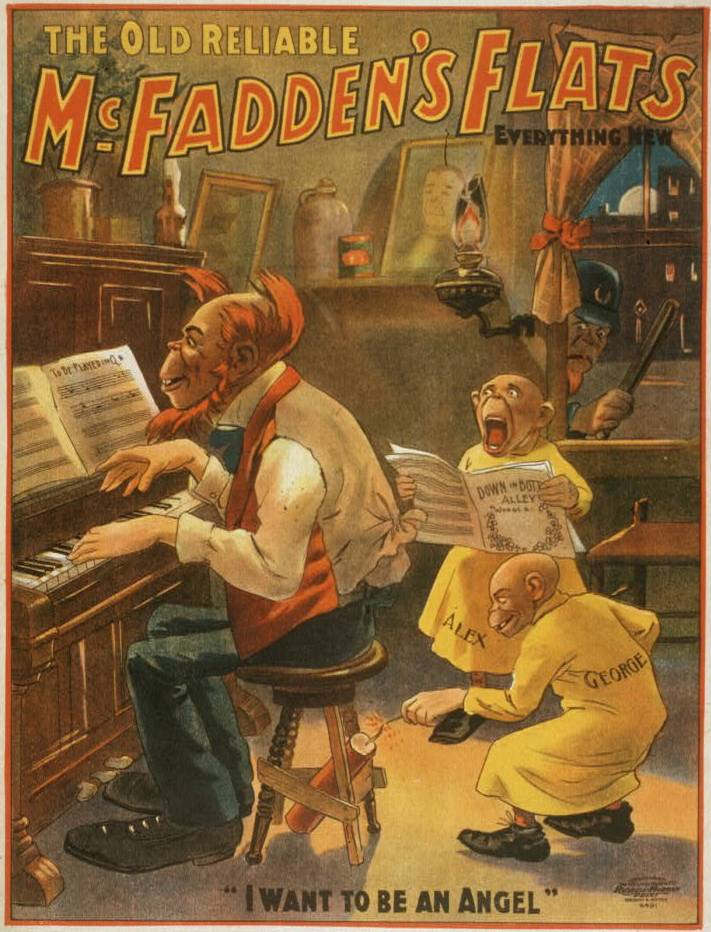
Poster for McFadden's Flats (1902), based on a series from The Yellow Kid

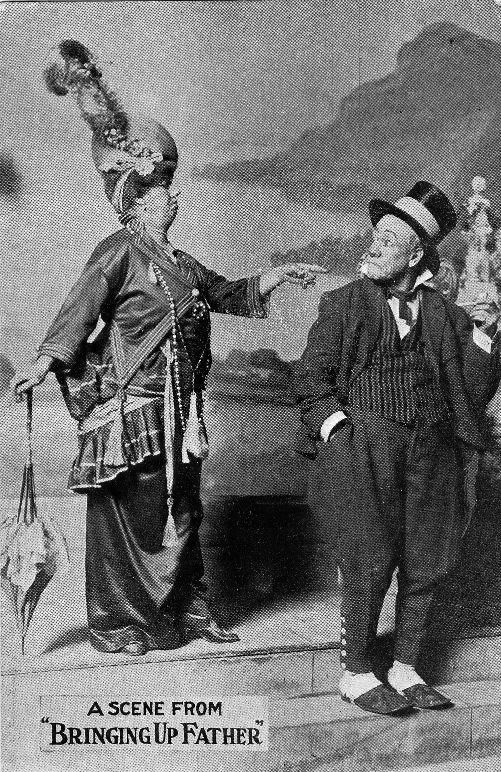
Scene from Hill's 1914 production of Bringing Up Father

== Cartoon theatricals ==
A "cartoon theatrical" is a live theater performance based on a comic strip or cartoon. More than two hundred cartoon theatricals were produced between 1896 and 1927, about fifty of them original and the others derivative. Gus Hill was involved in over half of them. In the 1890s Hill started producing a vaudeville act that was based on New York Sunday World's cartoon, The Yellow Kid. He later added characters from other cartoons such as Mutt and Jeff and the Happy Hooligan. He was also responsible for Alphonse and Gaston and Bringing Up Father among others. Most of the theatricals were musical comedies. Hill produced these "cartoon theatricals", or musicals based on comic strips, into 1920s. The theatricals would first play in legitimate road shows, then move to Hill's burlesque franchises.

The Yellow Kid cartoon featured a series called McFadden's Row of Flats in the New York Journal in 1896. Gus Hill's McFadden's Row of Flats opened in London on 22 October 1896. The play was a broad comedy revolving around interactions between Dan McFadden and Sandy McTavish, stereotypes of the witty Irishman and the tight-fisted Scot. Another theme is McFadden's daughter, who is sent to finishing school and becomes too much of a lady to acknowledge her father in public. In the end McFadden's daughter marries McTavish's son and all ends well. The play was the basis for the silent film McFadden's Flats made in 1927 and another silent film with the same name made in 1935. The 1927 film featured Charlie Murray, Chester Conklin and Edna Murphy. The 1935 film, adapted by Casey Robinson, featured Walter C. Kelly, Andy Clyde and Richard Cromwell. It remained true to the play's vaudeville origins and received friendly reviews.

Hill's Mutt and Jeff, and sequels such as Mutt and Jeff in Panama (1913–14) and Mutt and Jeff in College (1915–16), ran from the 1910–11 season through to the 1927–28 season, and at one time had six companies playing the show in different places. In 1922 Hill staged a version of Mutt and Jeff performed by Conoly's Colored Comedians at the Lafayette Theatre, New York. A reviewer in Billboard said :There is no reason why this show should not furnish a very complete evening's entertainment for either colored or white audiences. In the twenty-three song numbers and specialties one is certain to find several that will tickle any fancy. The chorus is fast and the wardrobe gorgeous." Hill first staged Happy Hooligan in the early 1900s, and was still staging a version of that show in the 1923–24 season. Bringing up Father ran from 1913–14 to 1932–33, with up to three companies at one time.

In April 1921 Hill spoke as president of the 110-member Touring Managers' Association, which employed about 6,000 actors. He said his group would strongly oppose the Actors' Equity Association. He said the increasing exactions of the actors, the musicians and the stage hands had made producing more and more unprofitable. By the 1927–28 season the Columbia Burlesque Circuit was struggling financially. This was the last season where cartoon theatricals were a significant part of the burlesque shows. Hill produced Gus Hill's Midgets in 1929, marking the end of his career as a producer. He continued to perform as a club swinger in charitable events and nostalgia shows.

Gus Hill died of a heart attack in New York City on 20 April 1937. He was aged 79.

== Broadway productions ==
Broadway shows produced by Hill included:

- Southern Enchantment (Musical, Comedy, Extravaganza, Original) February 23, 1903 – March 7, 1903
- In Posterland (Musical, Comedy, Original) March 23–28, 1903
- Spotless Town (Musical, Comedy, Original) April 2–7, 1903
- Happy Hooligan (Musical, Comedy, Farce, Original) May 4–12, 1903
- Around the Clock (Musical, Comedy, Farce, Revival) January 6–11, 1908
- Bringing Up Father (Musical, Comedy, Original) March 30 – April 18, 1925

== Publications ==
- Hill, Gus (1880). Gus Hill's Champion Club-swinging and Dumb-bell Manual: A Complete Guide by which Any One Can Learn These Healthy Exercises, as it Contains Instructions in Everything Appertaining to These Useful and Beneficial Accomplishments, Together with the Requirements and Construction of the Gymnasium. New York Popular Publishing Company.
- Hill, Gus (1889). Gus Hill's World of Novelties Songster. E.E. Benedict.
- Cahn, Julius; Hill, Gus (1903). The Julius Cahn-Gus Hill Theatrical Guide and Moving Picture Directory. New York, N.Y.
- Hill, Gus; Huntington, E. S. S.; Tannehill, Frank; Webster, Howard (1911). Mutt and Jeff. Columbia Theatre (Organization : Washington, D.C.), Theater Playbills and Programs Collection: Library of Congress.
- Hill, Gus; Burrows, Tom (1913). Club Swinging. Richard K. Fox Publishing Company.

== Sources ==
- Abbott, Berenice (1973-06-01). New York in the Thirties. Courier Dover Publications. ISBN 978-0-486-22967-6.
- Cullen, Frank; Hackman, Florence; McNeilly, Donald (2004). "Gus Hill". Vaudeville old & new: an encyclopedia of variety performances in America. Psychology Press. ISBN 978-0-415-93853-2.
- Fields, Armond (2002-01-22). Fred Stone: Circus Performer and Musical Comedy Star. McFarland. ISBN 978-0-7864-1161-0.
- Gevinson, Alan (1997). "McFadden's Flats". Within Our Gates: Ethnicity in American Feature Films, 1911–1960. University of California Press. ISBN 978-0-520-20964-0.
- "Gus Hill". IBDB.
- "Gus Hill". IMDb.
- Handy, William Christopher (1991). Father of the Blues: An Autobiography. Perseus Books Group. ISBN 978-0-306-80421-2.
- "New Burlesque Circuit". New York Times Article. 10 May 1915. Archived from the original on 15 May 2014.
- Peterson, Bernard L. Jr. (1993-10-25). A Century of Musicals in Black and White: An Encyclopedia of Musical Stage Works By, About, or Involving African Americans. ABC-CLIO. ISBN 978-0-313-06454-8.
- Peterson, Bernard L. (1997-01-01). The African American Theatre Directory, 1816–1960: A Comprehensive Guide to Early Black Theatre Organizations, Companies, Theatres, and Performing Groups. Greenwood Publishing Group. ISBN 978-0-313-29537-9.
- Sampson, Henry T. (2013-10-30). Blacks in Blackface: A Sourcebook on Early Black Musical Shows. Scarecrow Press. ISBN 978-0-8108-8351-2.
- Sennwald, Andre (13 March 1935). "A New Film Version of 'McFadden's Flats' at the Rialto – 'In a Monastery Garden.'". The New York Times.
- Slide, Anthony (2012). "Gus Hill". The Encyclopedia of Vaudeville. Univ. Press of Mississippi. ISBN 978-1-61703-250-9.
- "The Yellow Kid 1896". San Francisco Academy of Comic Art Collection. The Ohio State University Cartoon Research Library.
- "Touring Managers Fight Equity Shop". New York Times. April 1921. Archived from the original on 2014-05-15.
- Winchester, Mark David (1995). "Cartoon Theatricals from 1896 to 1927: Gus Hill's Cartoon Shows for the American Road Theatre". Ohio State University.
