= Edward Green =

Edward Green may refer to:

- Sir Edward Green, 1st Baronet (1831–1923), English ironmaster and Conservative MP for Wakefield 1874 and 1885–92
- Edward B. Green (judge), first chief justice of the Oklahoma Territorial Supreme Court (1890-1893)
- Edward Brodhead Green (1855–1950), American architect
- Edward C. Green (born 1944), director of the Harvard University AIDS Prevention Research Project
- Edward D. Green (1865–1936), state legislator in Illinois
- Edward Ernest Green (1861–1949), English entomologist
- Edward H. R. Green (1868–1936), known as Colonel Green, American philanthropist, philatelist, and numismatist
- Edward J. Green (1948–2019), American economist
- Ted Green (Edward Joseph Green, 1940–2019), Canadian ice hockey player
- Edward L. Greene (1884–1952), sometimes spelt Green, American football player and coach of football and baseball
- Edward T. Green (1837–1896), U.S. federal judge
- Edward Tony Green (born 1956), American bass player
- J. Edward Green (1871–1910), American actor, playwright and production manager
- Edward Green, inventor (1845) of the fuel economizer
- Ed Green (baseball) (1860–1912), pitcher in Major League Baseball
- Ed Green (Law & Order), character in the NBC crime drama Law & Order

== See also ==
- Edward Green & Co., English shoemaker
- Edward Greene (disambiguation)
