= John William Isham =

American vaudeville impresario

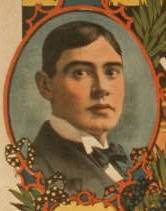
- John W. Isham from a poster for Oriental America
- Born: 1866; Utica, New York, US
- Died: September 24, 1902 (aged 35–36); Whitestone, New York
- Occupation: Vaudeville impresario
- Known for: Octoroons

John William Isham (1866 – September 24, 1902) was an American vaudeville impresario who was known for his Octoroons and Oriental America shows. These had their roots in traditional minstrel shows but included chorus girls, sketches and operas. They were part of the transition to the American burlesque shows of the early 20th century.

== Early years ==
John William Isham was born in Utica, New York in 1866. He had some African-American ancestry but was fair-skinned and often passed for white. When he entered show business he was therefore allowed to assume responsible positions in management and advertising. He worked for the Ryan & Robinson circus in the 1883–84 season in the advertising department. He then worked for the Sells Brothers (1885–86) and Barnum & Bailey (1886–88).

Isham was employed as advance man for the Creole Burlesque Show by Sam T. Jack. The show, which ran from 1890 to 1897, was the first to present beautiful black women as chorus girls in place of the traditional all-male chorus. It has been called the first black burlesque show. It included original songs, sketches and comedy numbers by black artists. Isham played a role of growing importance in the Creole Burlesque Show. In 1893 a writer in the Indianapolis Freeman said of Isham that he "has done more for the advancement of the colored race in all America than any other man since the day of its emancipation."

== Octoroons ==
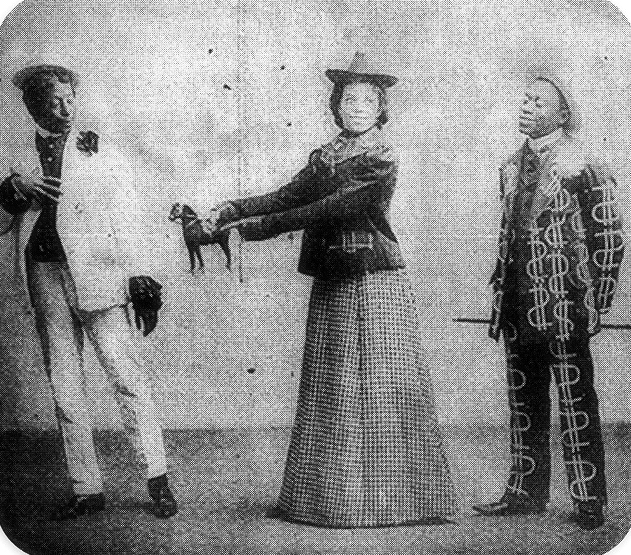
Scene from The Octoroons. Left to right: Walter Smart, Stella Wiley, George Williams

Isham decided to form his own company in 1895. This was the second major show to feature beautiful black chorus girls. It was first called Isham's Creole Opera, then renamed The Royal Octoroons and then Isham's Octoroons after Jack threatened to sue Isham over the name. The show was co-owned by Ernest Graff. The original Octoroons show had sixteen male and seventeen female performers.

The Octoroons kept some of the structure of the traditional minstrel show, but with significant changes. The original show was in three parts, with scenes based on New York City. The first part opened with a chorus, followed by songs performed by the leading soloists, supported by the chorus girls. The second part was a burlesque sketch, a series of specialty acts very loosely woven into a story. The third part had a cakewalk jubilee, a military drill and a "chorus march".

The show was organized in New York city. Venues included Waldman's Theatre in Newark, New Jersey; the Empire Theatre in Philadelphia; Howard's Theatre in Louisville, Kentucky; the Brooklyn Music Hall in Brooklyn, New York; the Corning Opera House in Corning, New York; the Park Theatre in Indianapolis, Indiana; and the Howard Atheneum in New York City. Performers in the original Octoroons included Madame Mamie Flowers, Fred Piper, Jesse Shipp, Billy Johnson, Mamie Emerson, Bell Davis, Bob Kelly, Tom Brown, Frank Mallory, Edward Mallory, Tom McIntosh, Hattie McIntosh, Shorty May, Ed Ferber, and George Hammond. The show was well received. A critic wrote of Tom and Hattie McIntosh that "Both have an intelligent idea of low comedy, and their act is full of new and original humor."

The Octoroons toured for five years until 1900 in the Northeast and Midwest of the US, and continued to run after Isham produced his Oriental America (1896–1899). Other notable entertainers who performed with the Octoroons included Bert Williams, George Walker, and the Griffin Sisters.

== Oriental America ==
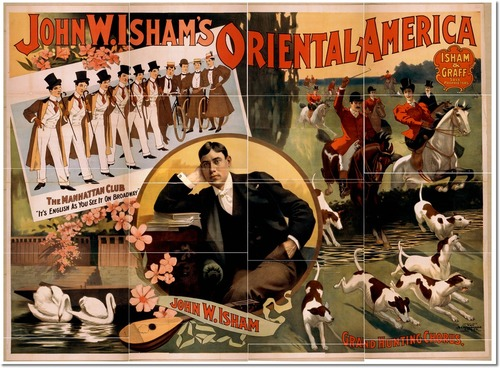
Poster for Oriental America

Isham created a larger singing show named Oriental America, which opened at Palmer's Theatre on Broadway, Manhattan, in 1896. It was given good reviews, although it was not a huge commercial success. This was the first show to appear on Broadway with an all-African American cast. A reviewer in the Morning Times of Washington, D.C., wrote on 9 November 1896, "Scarcely has an audience left the theatre more thoroughly pleased and delighted over a performance than the one which filed out of the Academy of Music last week. The attractions was Isham's Oriental America, presented by a company of sweet singers and talented performers, the cream of the colored race." The reviewer singled out the performances of the soprano Mattie Wilkes, the comedian Billy Eldridge, the tenor Sydney Woodward, vocalists Jesse Shipp and Edward Winn.

== Evolution ==
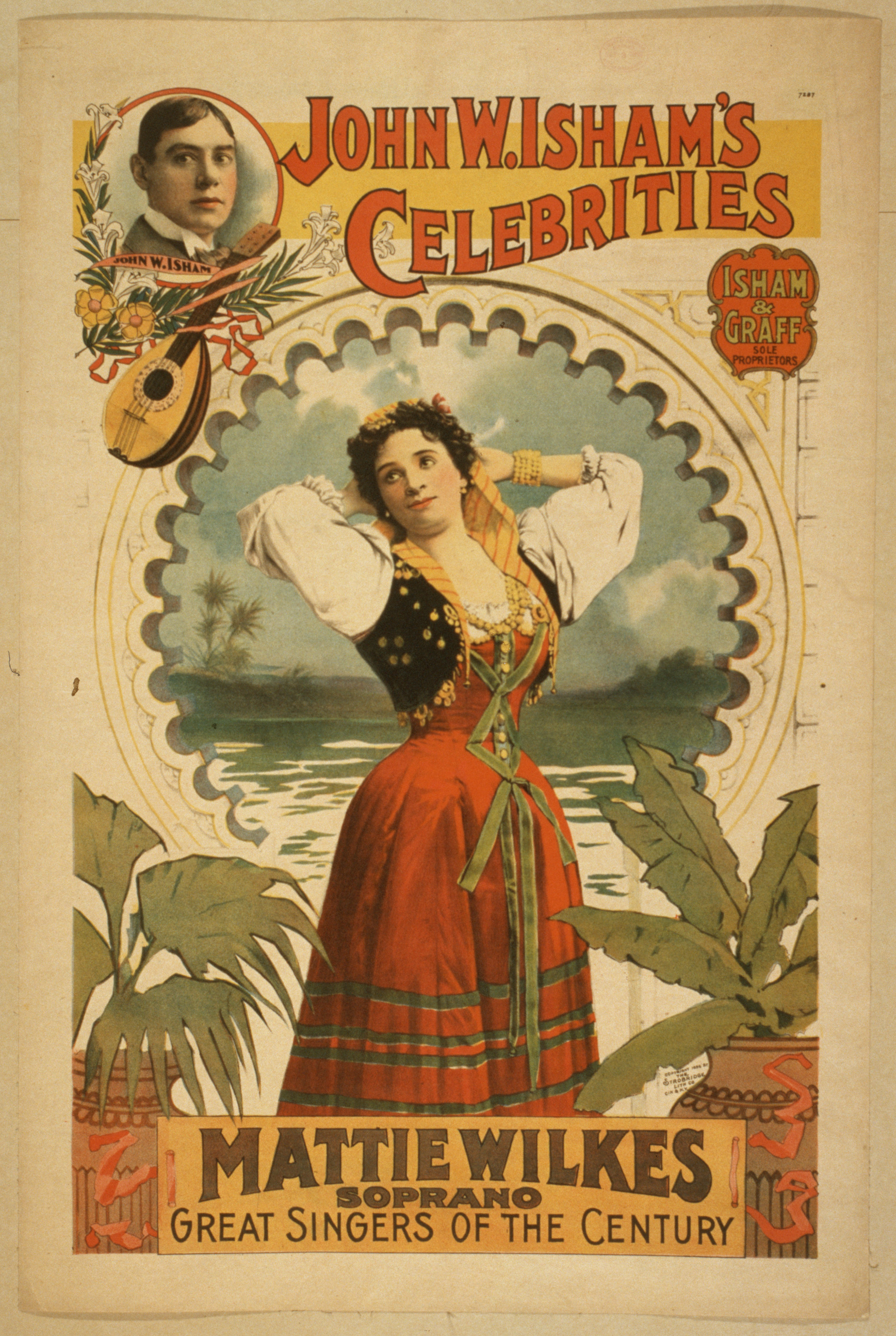
Mattie Wilkes, Soprano

The three-part format went through various changes over time. The shows now opened with a sketch, which before would have been the afterpiece. They then included star specialties, and ended with performances by the whole cast of popular operas and operettas. The shows were less uplifting and more cynical than the musicals that the Hyers sisters were presenting at the time. The Blackville Derby is a sketch about horse racing that does not depict upwardly mobile African Americans, but more lazy and cunning characters.

In 1897 and 1898 Isham had three companies, two touring in the US and one in Great Britain for a year. Each company opened with a new farce each season. The shows drew good audiences, but in most large cities were not staged in first-run theaters. Audiences in the USA were generally segregated. Some notable numbers were The Carnival of Venice (1895, operatic extravaganza); The Darkville Derby (1896), renamed The Blackville Derby (1897, skit about horse racing); Susanna Sampson's Wedding Day (1898, comic skit); The Ninth Battalion on dress parade, escorted by the Darktown Bandoleers, in a cake walk and jubilee (1898, skit); The Booking Agency (1900, comic sketch).

A critic who saw the Oriental America company perform in Liverpool, England, wrote of it:

The ludicrous mirth-making Negro sketch called The Blackville Derby epitomising in very large degree the true type of Negro fun, character, frolic and pastimes, was given at the Court Theatre on Monday with considerable success. No more striking evidence of the progress of the colored race can be found in America than that which is to be met with in the Oriental American performance under the direction of John W. Isham who has displayed the very wisest discretion in the selection of his coloured company. The whole of the members of the combination with scarcely a single exception are genuine Negroes, mulattos, or quadroons. There is no sequence in any slight story attaching to the sketch, the chief object of which is to show in a vivid way the picturesque features of the more pleasant side of the old slave life. Hence there are introduced quaint and characteristic melodies, sand and buck dancing, graphic illustrations of what is known as the "cake walk" (one of the merriest and liveliest festivals of the American coloured native); and a grand operatic performance in which great musical talent is displayed by the principals.

By 1900 Isham was struggling against competing shows by Bob Cole and Williams & Walker. He retired from managing the shows. His brother Will Isham attempted to continue the Octoroon company with an operatic comedy show called King Rastus (1901–05) that reverted to the earlier tradition of minstrel or "coon" shows. It discarded all the advances that John Isham had introduced.

== Sources ==
- Abbott, Lynn; Seroff, Doug (2003). Out of Sight: The Rise of African American Popular Music, 1889–1895. Univ. Press of Mississippi. ISBN 978-1-60473-039-5.
- Everett, Nicholas; Everett, William A.; Laird, Paul R. (2002-12-09). The Cambridge Companion to the Musical. Cambridge University Press. ISBN 978-0-521-79639-2.
- Kinshasa, Kwando Mbiassi (2006-01-01). African American Chronology: Chronologies of the American Mosaic. Greenwood Publishing Group. p. 73. ISBN 978-0-313-33797-0.
- Peterson, Bernard L. (1993-01-01). A Century of Musicals in Black and White: An Encyclopedia of Musical Stage Works By, About, Or Involving African Americans. Greenwood Publishing Group. p. 253. ISBN 978-0-313-26657-7.
- Peterson, Bernard L. (2001). Profiles of African American Stage Performers and Theatre People, 1816–1960. Greenwood Publishing Group. ISBN 978-0-313-29534-8.
- Riis, Thomas L. (Spring 1986). "The Experience and Impact of Black Entertainers in England, 1895–1920". American Music. 4 (1). University of Illinois Press: 50–58. doi:10.2307/3052184. JSTOR 3052184.
- Sampson, Henry T. (2013-10-30). Blacks in Blackface: A Sourcebook on Early Black Musical Shows. Scarecrow Press. ISBN 978-0-8108-8351-2.
- Watkins, Mel (1999-05-01). On the Real Side: A History of African American Comedy from Slavery to Chris Rock. Chicago Review Press. ISBN 978-1-56976-760-3.
