= S. H. Dudley =

S. H. Dudley may refer to:

- Sherman H. Dudley (1872–1940), American vaudeville entertainer and pioneer black theater entrepreneur
- Sherman H. Dudley Jr. (1904–1974), American actor and film director, son of Sherman H. Dudley
- Samuel H. Rous (1864–1947), American pioneer recording artist and singer with the Haydn Quartet, who was usually billed as S. H. Dudley
