= Tom McIntosh (disambiguation) =

Tom McIntosh (born 1927) is an American jazz trombonist, composer, arranger and conductor.

Tom McIntosh may also refer to:

- Tom McIntosh (comedian) (1840–1904), African-American comedian who starred in Callender's Georgia Minstrels
- Tom McIntosh (soccer) (born 1966), head men's soccer coach at the University of Tulsa
- Tom McIntosh (politician), Australian politician and member of the Victorian Legislative Council
- Thomas H. McIntosh (1879–1935), secretary manager of Darlington, Middlesbrough and Everton football club
