= Dimples (1936 film) =

1936 film by William A. Seiter

- Theatrical release poster
- Directed by: William A. Seiter
- Written by: Nat Perrin; Arthur Sheekman
- Produced by: Nunnally Johnson; Darryl F. Zanuck
- Starring: Shirley Temple; Frank Morgan; Helen Westley
- Cinematography: Bert Glennon
- Music by: Jimmy McHugh
- Distributed by: 20th Century-Fox
- Release date: October 16, 1936
- Running time: 79 minutes
- Country: United States
- Language: English
- Box office: $1 million

Dimples is a 1936 American musical drama film directed by William A. Seiter. The screenplay was written by Nat Perrin and Arthur Sheekman. The film was panned by the critics. Videocassette and DVD versions of the film were available in 2009.

== Plot ==
A young mid-nineteenth century street entertainer, Sylvia, is separated from her pickpocket grandfather when given a home by a wealthy New York City widow. Her grandfather, The Professor, has wrangled an invitation for Sylvia and her young friends to entertain at a lavish mansion party. But when Sylvia discovers The Professor has stolen a cuckoo clock from the house, she returns it the next day. Her honesty cements the friendship between herself and the crusty Caroline Drew. But Caroline still dislikes actors in general—and disinherits her nephew when he announces his intention to become a theatrical producer and put on the first performance of UNCLE TOM'S CABIN. Allen thinks Sylvia would be perfect for the lead, but to get her he has to take The Professor too. Entrusted with the entire $800.00 budget for the show, The Professor quickly loses it to some confidence men who sell him a "valuable watch".

To get Sylvia's job back, The Professor accepts Caroline's offer to have Sylvia live with her. But instead of taking the $5,000.00 for Sylvia, he sells her the watch for $1,000.00—just enough so the show can go on.

On opening night, Caroline discovers the watch is worthless. She brings policemen backstage on opening night to have The Professor arrested. Allen begs his Aunt to wait until the show is over—and by the time Sylvia has given her performance; nobody wants to arrest anybody. The show is a hit and runs for a year or more—and Allen can afford an expensive "musical afterpiece" called DIXIANA besides.

== Cast ==
- Shirley Temple as Sylvia Dolores "Dimples" Appleby, an 8-year-old girl who is a street performer in New York City circa 1850 and Professor Appleby's granddaughter
- Frank Morgan as Professor Eustace Appleby, a pickpocket who is also Dimples's grandfather
- Helen Westley as Mrs. Caroline Drew, Allen's aunt and Dimples's patroness
- Robert Kent as Allen Drew, a theatrical producer and Caroline Drew's nephew
- Astrid Allwyn as Cleo Marsh, a haughty actress and Allen's sudden romantic interest
- Delma Byron as Betty Loring, Allen's betrothed and the daughter of Colonel Loring
- Berton Churchill as Colonel Jasper Loring, Betty's father
- Julius Tannen as Emery T. Hawkins, a swindler
- John Carradine as Richards, a swindler
- Stepin Fetchit as Cicero, a servant
- Billy McClain as Rufus, Caroline Drew's Butler
- Jack Clifford as Uncle Tom, a character in Allen's new play
- Betty Jean Hainey as Topsy, a character in Allen's new play
- Paul Stanton as Mr. St. Clair, a character in Allen's new play
- The Hall Johnson Choir as Choir

== Production ==
This movie was originally to be titled The Bowery Princess but was changed as it was deemed too coarse for Temple's image.

There was a great deal of friction on the set of this movie as Morgan and Temple repeatedly tried to steal scenes from one another. Morgan would place his stovepipe hat on a table blocking Temple's face and forcing her to move her marks and out of the camera lights. He would also keep moving his hands near her eye level by tinkering with a handkerchief or placing on gloves. Temple for her part would either yawn or scratch her face. In the scene where Morgan's character gets ripped off by con men, Temple jiggled the fishing pole she was holding in the background in an attempt to draw attention away from Morgan. She also worked with Robinson to devise ways of creating rhythmic pauses and gestures in her dance movements to prevent scene stealing from Morgan. Producer Nunally Johnson, commenting on the scene stealing, remarked that "When this picture is over, either Shirley will have acquired a taste for Scotch whiskey or Frank will come out with curls."

== Music ==
The film's songs – "Hey, What Did the Blue Jay Say", "He Was a Dandy", "Picture Me Without You", "Get On Board", "Dixie-anna", and "Wings of the Morning" – were written by Jimmy McHugh and lyricist Ted Koehler. The dances were choreographed by Bill Robinson who appeared with Temple in four films and partnered her for the famous staircase tap dance in The Little Colonel.

Sony Computer Entertainment later used the song "Get On Board" for a PlayStation 2 advertisement entitled "Mountain". The ad won the Cannes Lions International Advertising Festival's Film Grand Prix award in 2004.

In 2024 and again in 2025, Australian over-the-top video streaming service Kayo Sports used a remix of "Get On Board" for their series of advertisements using the slogan Get On Board, showcasing the advantages of their sports streaming service.

== Release ==
=== Critical reception ===
New York Times reviewer Frank Nugent considered Dimples a generic Shirley Temple production, with unsurprising plot elements, and was of the opinion that "'Dimples' is not the best Temple, nor the worst.'"

Temple scholar Robert Windeler notes that Temple was upstaged for the first time in one of her pictures.

=== Home media ===
The film was released on DVD on March 12, 2002. In 2009, a videocassette was available in the original black and white and in computer-colorized versions of the original. Some editions included theatrical trailers and other special features.

== See also ==
- List of American films of 1936
- Shirley Temple filmography
