= Billy King (comedian) =

American vaudeville comedian

- Born: William King c. 1869 or 1875; Whistler, Alabama, U.S.
- Died: 1951 (aged 75-82); New York, U.S.
- Occupation: Comedian
- Years active: 1902-1926
- Spouse: Hattie McIntosh

William King (circa 1869 or 1875 – 1951) was an African-American vaudeville comedian who led the Billy King Stock Company and who was described as "a living link between the Harlem Renaissance and nineteenth-century black minstrelsy." He married fellow performer Hattie McIntosh.

== Biography ==
He was born in Whistler, Alabama, but left home when young. He formed his own company, "King and Bush, Wide-Mouth Minstrels", before joining the Georgia Minstrels. By around 1902 he was established as one of the leading comedians in the travelling troupe. He moved into vaudeville in 1911, and established his own company, writing prolifically and touring between bases in Atlanta, Kansas City, Savannah and elsewhere. The company included comedian Billy Higgins. In 1915, he and his company performed regularly at the Grand Theatre in Chicago. Some of his shows there starred Bessie Brown and Howard Kelly.

Between 1916 and 1923, he wrote, staged and starred in a succession of shows at the theater, often changing shows every week. He was responsible for introducing girls clowning at the end of chorus lines, an innovation later developed by Josephine Baker, and his shows sometimes included satire on race issues, with Lester Walton likening one of his shows to an NAACP protest meeting. Some of his shows went on tour to Harlem and other established vaudeville circuit stops, and he employed a large group of performers who included his protégé Gertrude Saunders, and Billy Higgins. King was also involved in running theaters in Louisville, Chattanooga, Atlanta and elsewhere.

From 1923 until 1925 he took his Billy King Road Show on tour until it disbanded in Oklahoma City. The band remained together as Walter Page's Oklahoma City Blue Devils, which in turn later provided the basis for Count Basie's Orchestra. King continued to perform occasionally, playing with Ethel Waters in 1926. In 1937 he was elected president of the Colored Actors' Protective Society in New York City.

He is believed to have died in New York in 1951.
