= Smart Set Company =

African American touring revue company

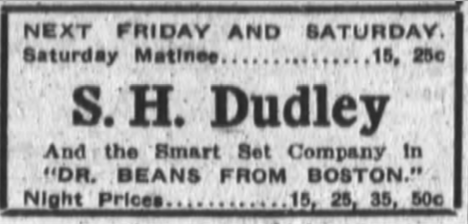
Ad for the Smart Set Theater Company led by S. H. Dudley

The Smart Set Company was an African American touring revue company fronted by Sherman H. Dudley who took over for Tom McIntosh. Dudley signed a five-year contract in 1904 and was considered the show's "chief fun maker." Reviews of a performance in Indiana in 1902 refer to singing, dancing and "clever acrobatic work" calling it "the smartest colored comedy in all of America." Their performances, which were not entirely minstrel shows, were often commentaries on race in America "a composite study of the stage from a racial viewpoint" covering "every phase of stagedom."

In 1909, the group split into a Northern and Southern Smart Set Company with the latter being managed by Salem Tutt Whitney. Dudley retired from working with The Smart Set in 1912 and worked on building his chain of theaters. After 1917 Dudley devoted himself to producing black musicals, including updated Smart Set productions.

The name was used later to refer to other collections of actors and performers who worked on the circuit performing comedies and musicals for a theater season, a point which Dudley was somewhat churlish about. Notable companies were Shark's Smart Set Company, Tolliver's Smart Set Company and Gus Hill's Smart Set Company.

== Performers ==
- Daisy M. Cheatham
- Sherman H. Dudley
- Ernest Hogan
- Billy McClain
- Tom McIntosh (comedian)
- Salem Tutt Whitney and J. Homer Tutt
- Aida Overton Walker

== See also ==
- Black Vaudeville
- African-American Musical Theater
