= McFadden's Flats (1927 film) =

1927 film by Richard Wallace

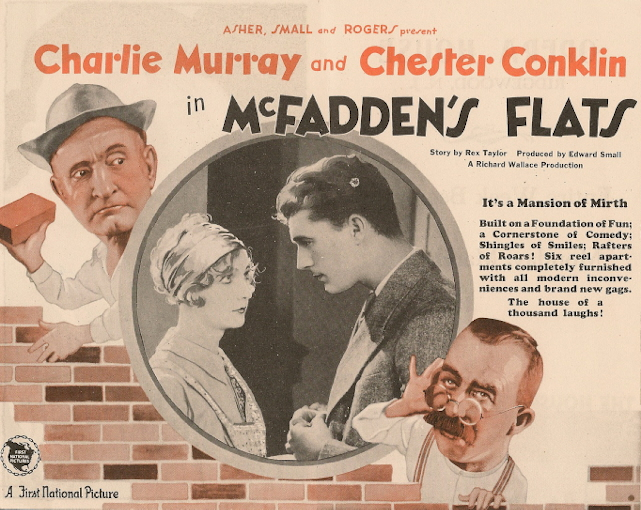
- Film poster
- Directed by: Richard Wallace
- Based on: McFadden's Row of Flats by Gus Hill
- Produced by: Edward Small
- Starring: Charlie Murray; Chester Conklin
- Cinematography: Arthur Edeson
- Production companies: Asher Small & Rogers
- Distributed by: First National
- Release date: February 6, 1927
- Running time: 80 minutes
- Country: United States
- Language: Silent (English intertitles)
- Box office: over $1 million

McFadden's Flats is a 1927 American silent comedy film directed by Richard Wallace and based on an 1896 play of the same name.

== Cast ==
- Charles Murray as Dan McFadden (credited as Charlie Murray)
- Chester Conklin as Jock McTavish
- Edna Murphy as Mary Ellen McFadden
- Larry Kent as Sandy McTavish
- Aggie Herring as Mrs. McFadden
- DeWitt Jennings as Patrick Halloran
- Cissy Fitzgerald as Mrs. Halloran
- Dorothy Dwan as Edith Halloran
- Freeman Wood as Desmond Halloran
- Dot Farley as Bridget Maloney
- Leo White as Hat Salesman
- Harvey Clark as Interior Decorator

== Production ==
McFadden's Flats has held "a unique place in the hearts of theatregoers for more than thirty years", said Small in 1926. "But even this story requires changes and elaboration before it can be placed before screen audiences. This is partly due to the fact that the camera permits a visualisation of situations that could only be suggested on the stage."

In addition the villainy present in the original play was downplayed. Small:

The substitution of many laughs must have made up for the lack of villainy. Newer productions are proving that audiences the world over want to laugh, and that they don't mind if the usual rules of production are overlooked in the finding of those laughs. Successful entertainment of the future will run more and more to humour than sobs, and money will be emended for ideas rather than lavish settings.

Grant Clarke and Jack Wagner wrote three new comedy sequences for the movie which saw its shooting schedule extended from ten days to two weeks.

== Reception ==
The film was very popular.

== Preservation ==
McFadden's Flats is currently presumed lost. In February of 2021, the film was cited by the National Film Preservation Board on their Lost U.S. Silent Feature Films list.

== See also ==
- McFadden's Flats (1935 film)
