= Hattie McIntosh =

American entertainer

Hattie McIntosh (1860 - 1919) was a vaudeville performer who toured with successful shows and her husband, fellow performer Tom McIntosh.

She was from Detroit, Michigan.

Together they performed a show titled Mr. and Mrs. McIntosh in the King of Bavaria as well as in their show A Hot Old Time in Dixie. They also joined Sam T. Jack's The Creole Show. She starred in In Dahomey, Bandanna Land, and Mr. Lode of Koal,

International performances included Shaftesbury in 1903.

Her husband died of a stroke in 1904. She later married Billy King in 1912 and performed with the Billy King Stock Company. She performed in My Old Kentucky Home in July 1915 with King's company.

The New York Public Library has an image published from In Dahomey that includes McIntosh and her fellow lead actors performing a dance in Boston. That fall she was the lead in In Society.
