= Daisy M. Cheatham =

American actress, songwriter and vaudeville performer

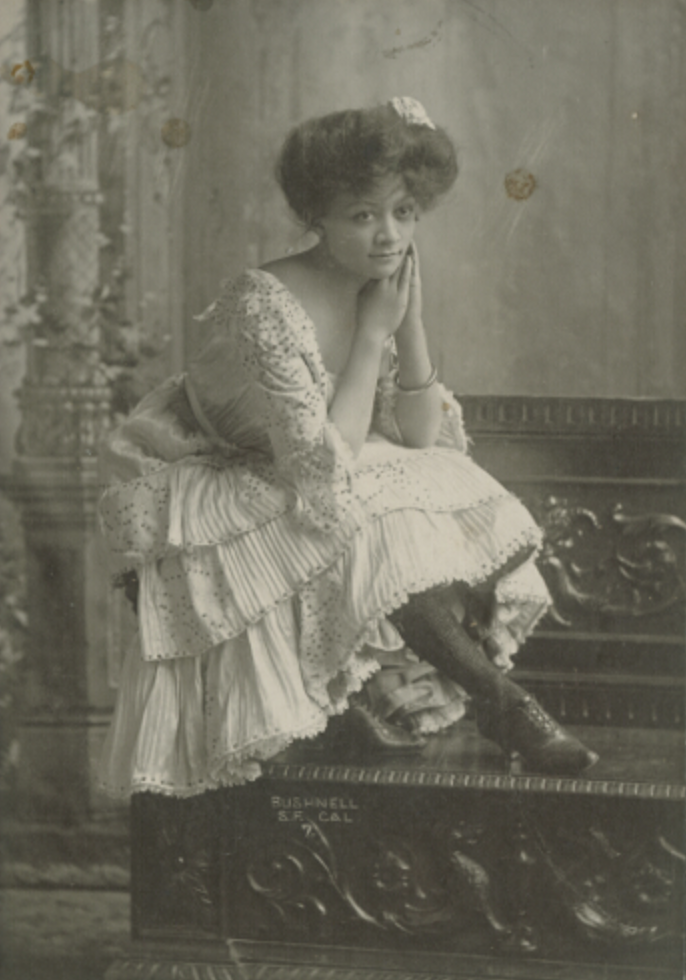
- Born: Washington D. C.
- Other names: Daisy Brymn, Daisy Mitchell
- Spouses: James Tim Brymn (divorced) Charles E. Cheatham (m. 1928)

Daisy Marion Mitchell Cheatham (born 1881) was an African American actress, songwriter and vaudeville performer who worked with Williams and Walker Company and the Smart Set Company. She wrote the lyrics to "Gypsy, my Gypsy Lou," and "Ask Mammy" which she published with James Tim Brymn. While working with the Smart Set she was a member of "The Colored Beauty Chorus" and did her own solo comic bits.

Cheatham was born in Washington, DC. to William P. Mitchell and Fannie P. Mitchell. She married James Tim Brymn in the early 1900s and traveled with him to London in 1904. The couple divorced in the early 1920s and she remarried to Charles E. Cheatham, son of ex-congressman Henry P. Cheatham, on October 7, 1928.
