= Nagana (1933 film) =

1933 film

- Directed by: Ernst L. Frank
- Screenplay by: Don Ryan; Dale Van Every
- Story by: Lester Cohen
- Produced by: Carl Laemmle, Jr.
- Starring: Tala Birell; Melvyn Douglas; Miki Morita; Onslow Stevens; Everett Brown; Billy McClain
- Cinematography: George Robinson
- Edited by: Robert Carlisle
- Production company: Universal Pictures
- Distributed by: Universal Pictures
- Release date: February 1, 1933
- Running time: 62 minutes
- Country: United States
- Language: English

Nagana is a 1933 American pre-Code drama film directed by Ernst L. Frank and written by Don Ryan and Dale Van Every. The film stars Tala Birell, Melvyn Douglas, Miki Morita, Onslow Stevens, Everett Brown and Billy McClain. The film was released on February 1, 1933, by Universal Pictures.

== Plot ==
A white doctor's struggle against fearful odds to discover a cure for sleeping sickness.”

== Cast ==
- Tala Birell as Countess Sandra Lubeska
- Melvyn Douglas as Dr. Walter Tradnor
- Miki Morita as Dr. Kabayochi
- Onslow Stevens as Dr. Roy Stark
- Everett Brown as Nogu
- Billy McClain as The King
- William R. Dunn as Mukovo
- Frank Lackteen as Ivory Trader
- Noble Johnson as Head Boatman
