= Edward Greene (sport shooter) =

American sports shooter

Personal information
- Born: August 19, 1875
- Died: February 23, 1957 (aged 81) Bethesda, Maryland

Sport
- Sport: Sports shooting

Edward Alonzo Greene (August 19, 1875 – February 23, 1957) was an American sports shooter. He competed in two events at the 1908 Summer Olympics. He later served as a colonel in the United States Marine Corps. He was also a leader in the Fort Gaines Lock and Dam Project. He died at the Bethesda Naval Hospital in 1957.
