= The Virginia Judge (film) =

1935 film by Edward Sedgwick

- Directed by: Edward Sedgwick
- Screenplay by: Frank R. Adams; Inés López
- Story by: Octavus Roy Cohen; Walter C. Kelly
- Produced by: Henry Herzbrun; Charles R. Rogers
- Starring: Walter C. Kelly; Marsha Hunt; Stepin Fetchit; Johnny Downs; Robert Cummings; Virginia Hammond
- Cinematography: Milton R. Krasner
- Edited by: Richard C. Currier
- Music by: John Leipold
- Production company: Paramount Pictures
- Distributed by: Paramount Pictures
- Release date: September 17, 1935
- Running time: 62 minutes
- Country: United States
- Language: English

The Virginia Judge is a 1935 American drama film directed by Edward Sedgwick, written by Frank R. Adams and Inés López, and starring Walter C. Kelly, Marsha Hunt, Stepin Fetchit, Johnny Downs, Robert Cummings and Virginia Hammond. It was released on September 17, 1935, by Paramount Pictures.

== Cast ==
- Walter C. Kelly as Judge
- Marsha Hunt as Mary Lee Calvert
- Stepin Fetchit as Spasm Johnson
- Johnny Downs as Bob Stuart
- Robert Cummings as Jim Preston
- Virginia Hammond as Martha Davis

== Reception ==
Variety gave a positive review and wrote of Kelly, "As a screen character Kelly is as welcome as he was in vaude [sic]. He is at home in front of the camera, and records well." They continued, "In the writing, casting and direction a distinctly southern flavor has been captured and the settings of a little town also lend authentielty to the atmosphere."

Modern Screen gave the film a four-star review and described it as a “pleasant homey type of picture”. It said “the youngsters (Robert Cummings, Johnny Downs and Marsha Hunt) are pleasant and the comedy, as handled by Stepin Fetchit, is both spontaneous and funny”.
