= Sam T. Jack =

American burlesque impresario

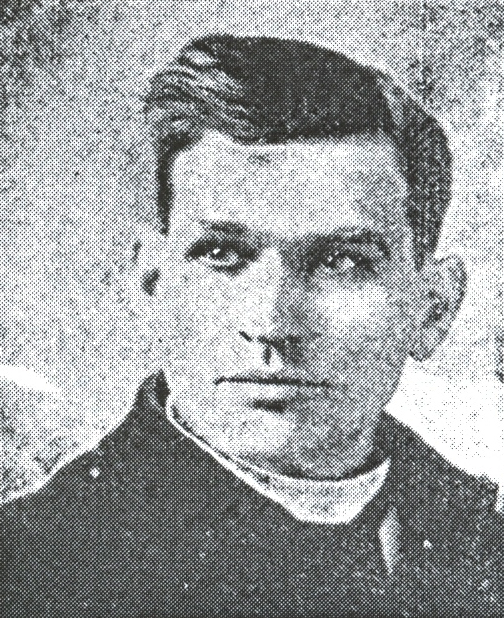
- Sam T. Jack from the frontispiece of the promotional biography How He Does It (1895)
- Born: 31 December 1852; Pennsylvania, US
- Died: 1899 (aged 47)
- Occupation: Impresario
- Known for: The Creole Show

Sam T. Jack (31 December 1852 – 1899), a burlesque impresario, was a pioneer of the African-American vaudeville industry in the US with his Creole Burlesque Show. He was also known for staging increasingly risqué shows in Chicago, where young women appeared wearing only skin-colored tights.

== Early years ==
Sam T. Jack was born on 31 December 1852 in rural Pennsylvania. According to an 1895 biography, which he may have commissioned and may be unreliable, he served in the army for a short period, and then in the oil business in western Pennsylvania. In 1872 he opened the Oil City Opera in Oil City, Pennsylvania. He opened other opera houses in nearby Franklin and Titusville that specialized in melodrama. His biography says that from 1873 to 1877 he ran a showboat, and his Alice Oates Comic Opera Company toured the US in 1880–84.

There are records of Sam Jack being the principal of the Sam Jack Stock Company in Oil City. Jack's Oil Region Circuit was able to provide far better entertainment than had been offered in the past. Thus at the start of the 1877–78 season he brought in the Berger family's troupe, providing a respectable entertainment of music and sketches, Duprey and Benedicts Minstrels, the Washburn troupe and the Union Square Theatre Company. Jack was manager of Eliza Weathersby's Froliques, a variety show, which also played in the oil region. In 1878 the recently remodeled opera house reopened under his management. He had other theater interests in the area. Thus on 13 December 1879 the Meadville Evening Republican reported, "Mr. Sam Jack, the manager, who has given Meadville and the towns of the region so many entertainments of the highest order this season, deserves the most liberal patronage of the public ... for his enterprise and good judgment as a caterer to the best classes of theatre goers."

In 1879 Jack became manager of the newly renovated Pillot's Opera House in Houston. Jack began his career as a burlesque manager in 1881, when he was responsible for the number two company of Michael B. Leavitt's Rentz-Santely review. It was based in Chicago and toured the western USA. Jack added risqué elements from Western honky‐tonk entertainments to the shows. After leaving Leavitt, Jack opened the Lilly Clay Colossal Gaiety Company, the first of his own burlesque shows. The star of the show, Lilly Clay, came from England. Leavitt says in his memoirs that he sold Jack the title "Lilly Clay Gaiety Company" for $5,000 in 1889. Jack's biography does not mention Leavitt at all, but portrays Jack as entirely self-made.

== The Creole Show ==
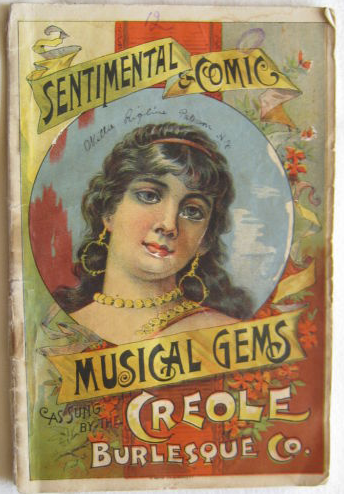
Cover of Musical Gems, a book of songs by Sam T. Jack's Creole Burlesque Co.

Sam T. Jack produced The Creole Show between 1890 and 1897. It represents a stage in the transition from the traditional minstrel shows to the vaudeville revue. It is said that Sam Lucas came up with the idea of a creole burlesque company, and persuaded Sam T. Jack to put it on. It was the first to present beautiful black women as chorus girls in place of the traditional all-male chorus. It has been called the first black burlesque show. It included original songs, sketches and comedy numbers by black artists.

The show opened with three women interlocutors or conversationalists sitting in the center. They were flanked by eight lavishly costumed chorus girls on each side. There were male performers at each end and in the orchestra. The show followed the traditional three-part minstrel pattern. In the first part there was an exchange of repartee between the interlocuters and comedians, and songs and dances by individuals and the chorus. In the second part there were various sketches and variety acts. The third part was a burlesque. The show was innovative in giving women a leading role and in introducing burlesque by African Americans.

The Creole Show opened in Haverhill, Massachusetts, on 4 August 1890, and traveled to Boston, Brooklyn and Manhattan. The show opened in Chicago in 1891 in Sam T. Jack's Opera House, and toured on Jack's circuit. Local girl Belle Davis was in that company. On 4 June 1892 it was announced that Sam T. Jack had stopped traveling and settled at the Madison Street Opera House in Chicago. The Creole Burlesque Company played here for most of the summer of 1893. In August 1893 it was announced that "Six women from Honolulu, dancing what manager Jack styles the Hullu-Hullu gavotte, are this week added to the drawing powers of his Creole Burlesquers.

In the 1893–94 season the cast was joined by Charles E. Johnson and Dora Dean, a dancing team that specialized in the cakewalk, the composer, performer and stage manager Bob Cole and the dancer Stella Wiley, who later married Bob Cole. In the early 1890s Tom McIntosh and Hattie McIntosh had put together Mr. and Mrs. McIntosh in the King of Bavaria, a vaudeville act. The McIntoshes played with Sam T. Jack's Creole Show in 1894. Other artists who performed with the show included Billy McClain and his wife Cordelia McClain as well as the groundbreaking male impersonator Florence Hines and ragtime comedian Irving Jones.

John W. Isham, the advance agent for the Creole Show, decided to produce his own show in 1895, also using beautiful black women as chorus girls. At first called Isham's Creole Opera Co., the name was changed to Isham's Octoroons to avoid legal challenges.

== Other shows and legacy ==
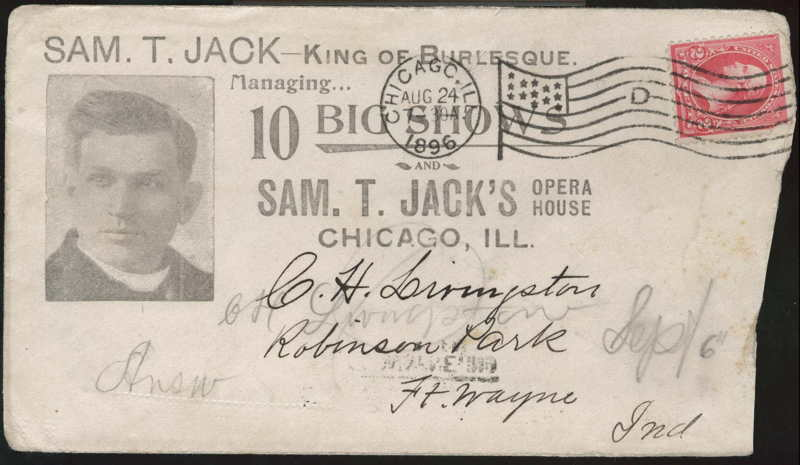
1896 Postcard advertising the Sam T. Jack Opera House in Chicago

In Manhattan in the 1890s Sam T. Jack's Tenderloin Company presented living statues of young women dressed only in flesh-colored tights, and others doing daring performances of the cancan. Preachers in New York regularly denounced his shows. Jack moved to Chicago, which was less straight-laced. He hired the bellydancer Little Egypt (Fahreda Mazar Spyropoulos) to appear at his Chicago Theatre after her appearance at the World's Columbian Exposition in 1893.

Jack blatantly promoted increasingly explicit burlesque. However, Jack's shows still included many of the elements of a musical comedy or revue, which lent them some legitimacy. Historians often credit Jack for the form that burlesque took in Chicago by the turn of the century.

Sam Jack married Emma Ward, a burlesque actress. He died in 1899, leaving an estate valued at $75,000, plus real estate holdings. His will was filed for probate on 2 June 1899. One third of the property went to his wife, Emma, and one third to his brother, James C. Jack. The rest was divided among various relatives, including his father, mother and various nephews and nieces. No provision was made for his illegitimate daughter by the actress Mabel Hazelton. The will said it was Jack's wish that his brother and widow should marry. His widow insisted that she be given the Sam T. Jack Theatre in Chicago, while his brother received the theater in New York.
