= Walter C. Kelly =

American comedian (1873–1939)

- Born: Walter Charles Kelly; October 29, 1873; Mineville, New York, U.S.
- Died: January 6, 1939 (aged 65); Philadelphia, Pennsylvania, U.S.
- Occupations: Vaudeville comedian; Actor

Walter Charles Kelly (October 29, 1873 – January 6, 1939) was an American vaudeville comedian, monologist and actor. He toured for some years, billed as "The Virginia Judge", and was sometimes credited as Walter "Judge" Kelly.

== Life and career ==
Kelly was born in Mineville, New York, into an Irish-American family. He was the elder brother of Jack Kelly (Olympic gold medalist and father of actress Grace Kelly) and Pulitzer Prize-winning playwright George Kelly. Walter was regarded as the "black sheep" of his family. After his family moved to Philadelphia, he rebelled against them, gambled and drank, and aged 20 went to work at the Huntington shipyards in Newport News, Virginia. He spent time observing at the local court, where judges gave summary justice to African Americans, generally poorly-educated, who were charged with various misdemeanours and felonies. After serving in the Spanish-American War, Kelly returned to Newport News and opened a cafe and gambling den.

He developed a talent for storytelling, drawing on the mannerisms and speech of the judges he had witnessed, and made his performing debut in New York City in 1900. His success led to theatre bookings and many tours on the vaudeville circuit. In 1904, he played in a sketch opposite Marie Dressler, which cemented his success and took him into the top rank of vaudeville performers. As "The Virginia Judge", he toured nationally and internationally and became a highly paid performer. Although Kelly did a number of different Southern dialects playing the various characters in his "Virginia Judge" sketches, an Irish flavor sometimes sneaked through. In one such sketch where three men appear before the Judge for "disturbin' the peace and quarrelin' on the highway", the word "highway" came through as very Irish. Most of his sketches, however, were racist humor at the expense of African Americans, which reflected his personal feelings. According to Anthony Slide, "by all accounts Kelly was as racist in person as his monologs read." For instance, in 1908 Bert Williams and George Walker, then starring in the successful Broadway production Bandanna Land, were asked to appear at a charity benefit by George M. Cohan. Kelly protested and encouraged the other acts to withdraw from the show rather than appear alongside black performers; only two of the acts joined Kelly's boycott. Kelly released many recordings based on his act on Victor Records, and also appeared in several Broadway productions himself.

He brought his signature role to the movies in the role of Judge Calhoun Davis in the 1935 Paramount film The Virginia Judge, based on a short story that he had written. His other movie acting roles include "'Guns' Costello" in Seas Beneath (1931); "Dan McFadden" in McFadden's Flats (1935); "Capt. Zack Livermore" in Tugboat Princess (1936); and "Pat Kelly" in Laughing Irish Eyes (1936). His autobiography, Of Me I Sing: An Informal Autobiography, was published in 1935.

On December 8, 1938, Kelly was struck by a car in Hollywood, California. He suffered head injuries and was taken to his brother's home in Philadelphia, Pennsylvania, where he died on January 6, 1939.
