= James Tim Brymn =

American jazz musician (died 1946)

Lieutenant James Tim Brymn

Background information
- Born: James Timothy Brymn; October 5, 1874 or 1881; Kinston, North Carolina, U.S.
- Died: October 3, 1946 (age 64-71) New York City, U.S.
- Occupations: Conductor, arranger, composer, pianist
- Instrument: Piano
- Years active: c. 1900–1930

James Timothy Brymn (October 5, 1874 or 1881 – October 3, 1946) was an African-American conductor, arranger, composer, and pianist who generally performed northeastern hot style jazz. He was usually credited as Lieutenant James Tim Brymn, and was sometimes billed as "Mr. Jazz Himself".

== Biography ==
He was born in Kinston, North Carolina; most sources indicate October 5, 1881, but researchers Bob Eagle and Eric LeBlanc suggest 1874 on the basis of his entry in the 1880 census. He studied at Christian Institute and Shaw University and received his musical education at the National Conservatory of Music. With Cecil Mack, he co-wrote popular songs, including "Good Morning, Carrie" (1901), "Josephine, My Jo" (1902), and "Please Go 'Way and Let Me Sleep" (1902). By 1905, Brymn had written five songs that were used in the Smart Set Company shows: "Morning Noon and Night", "O-San", "Powhatana", "Travel On", and "Darktown Grenadiers".

He joined the U.S. Army, and was commissioned as a Second Lieutenant, serving throughout the First World War with the 350th Field Artillery. He became the bandleader of the regimental band, the "Black Devils". In 1919, Brymn’s Black Devil Orchestra performed at the opening of the Paris Peace Conference, in front of President Woodrow Wilson and General John Pershing, and were later credited with introducing jazz to France. The all African-American 70 piece orchestra was described at the time as "a military symphony engaged in a battle of jazz." Willie "The Lion" Smith also served in the 350th Field Artillery Regiment and claimed to have received the nickname of "The Lion" for his bravery while in this unit.

Brymn and his musicians returned to the United States after the war. He led orchestras at two leading New York City nightclubs, Ziegfeld's Roof Garden and Reisenweber's Jardin de Dance, and made a series of recordings for OKeh Records, including "Daddy Won’t You Please Come Home," "Don’t Tell Your Monkey Man," and "Siren of the Southern Sea."

Later, in the 1920s, he became the musical director at James Reese Europe's Clef Club in Harlem, and for the Broadway theatre show Liza. With Chris Smith and Cecil Mack, he wrote "The Camel Walk", a popular dance tune in 1925. In 1933, he joined ASCAP.

Brymn was married possibly five times, to Lillie Smith, a woman known only as Jennie, Daisy Mitchell, Jeannette F. Lucas, and a woman known only as Dorothy. He died in New York City on October 3, 1946. Brymn was interred at Long Island National Cemetery on October 7.

== See also ==
- List of jazz arrangers
