= Tom McIntosh (comedian) =

American comedian

- Born: c. 1840; Lexington, Kentucky, US
- Died: 1904; Indianapolis, US
- Occupation: Comedian
- Known for: Callender's Georgia Minstrels

Tom McIntosh (c. 1840–1904) was an African-American comedian who starred in many minstrel shows in the US from the 1870s to the 1900s. He was considered one of the funniest performers in this genre.

== Early career ==
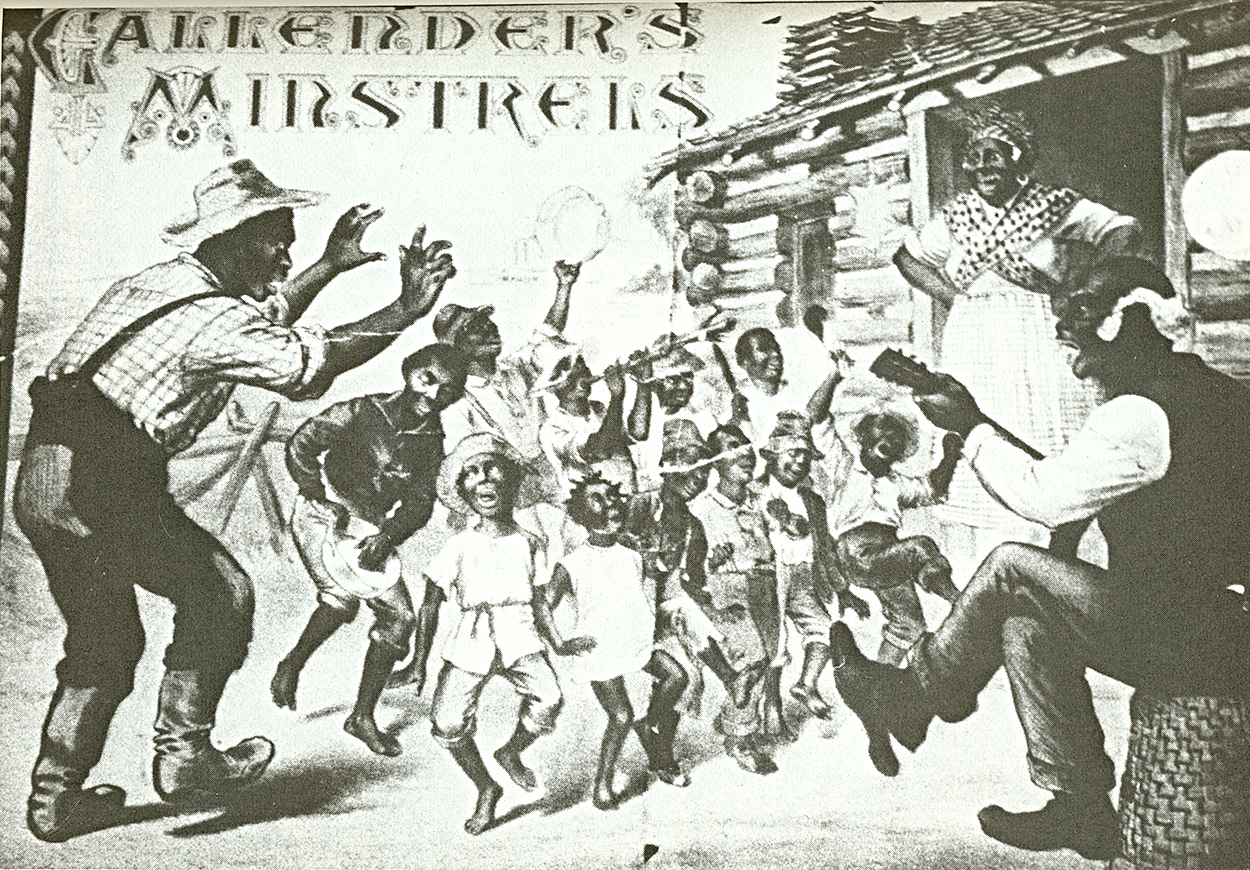
Callender's Colored Minstrels plantation scene

Tom McIntosh was born in Lexington, Kentucky in about 1840. He became an exhibition drummer, singer and comedian, singer. He teamed with the female impersonator Willis Ganze. McIntosh performed on some of the main entertainment circuits in America, notably with Charles Callender's Georgia Minstrels. He played with Charles Hicks and Billy Kersands in the Original Georgia Minstrels in the 1870s and 1880s.

In 1881 McIntosh took his comic drumming act to England with Haverly's Genuine Colored Minstrels. The proprietor of this troupe was J. H. Haverly, who had combined Callender's Minstrels with his United Mastodon Minstrels. The resulting 100-person show was often called the Black One Hundred. It was formed in Chicago, toured most of the large cities in the US, and in 1881–82 made a successful tour of Europe. The Callender company was then taken over by Charles Frohman, who built it into a huge company that toured in the US from 1882 to 1884 under names such as Callender's Colossal Consolidated Colored Minstrels. The company again toured Europe with Haverly's Minstrels in 1884.

McIntosh became part owner of McIntosh and Sawyer's Colored Callender Minstrels, and one of the leading black showmen in America. His wife, Hattie McIntosh (c. 1860 – 1919) first performed with the Colored Callender Minstrels in 1884.

== 1890s ==
McIntosh was the star of Cleveland's Colored Minstrels in 1890–91, which made a successful tour of the Pacific coast in 1890 and performed at the Bush Street Theatre in San Francisco. In the early 1890s Tom and Hattie McIntosh put together Mr. and Mrs. McIntosh in the King of Bavaria, a vaudeville act. Sam T. Jack's The Creole Show was an innovative cross between a minstrel show and vaudeville. It opened in Haverhill, Massachusetts, on 4 August 1890, and traveled to Boston, Brooklyn and Manhattan. The show opened in Chicago in 1891 in Jack's Opera House, and toured on Jack's circuit. Tom and Hattie McIntosh joined the show for the 1893–94 season. Tom and Hattie McIntosh were both in the original Octoroons show, produced by John William Isham in 1895.

Sissieretta Jones, the "Black Patti"

The Black Patti Troubabours opened on 7 September 1896 in Boston, Massachusetts. The show included a mix of comedy and other traditional minstrel show material with selections of opera music sung by Madame Sissieretta Jones. It played to mixed white and black audiences. Tom McIntosh was the leading comedian for the first season tour.

The McIntoshes then again joined Isham's Octoroons Company on tour. An article in the 3 July 1897 Indianapolis Freeman said of this show "... The Blackville Derby, an amused traversty upon the race track, serves to introduce a number of comedians, chief among the fun makers being Tom McIntosh, who is genuinely funny." In 1899 McIntosh was the star of A Hot Old Time in Dixie. The cast included Gussie Davis and Sherman H. Dudley. That year Tom and Hattie McIntosh toured England and Canada with Graham's Southern Speciality Company.

== Last years ==
McIntosh toured in 1900 with Rusco & Holland's Big Minstrel Festival. He opened in 1902 as head of Johnson's Operatic Cake Walker and Museum Co. in Springfield, Illinois. In 1903 he played with Tom Brown's Troubadours before joining the Smart Set Company. The Smart Set Company, managed by Gus Hill, staged vaudeville-style shows with comedy sketches, songs, dances and specialty acts. McIntosh succeeded Ernest Hogan as leading man of the Smart Set, and would be succeeded by Sherman H. Dudley. The Smart Set Company also starred Billy McClain.

McIntosh played Mr. Bullion in the Smart Set's Southern Enchantment. He received a poor review for his performance on 21 September 1903 in Hartford, Connecticut. The show moved south and played in Birmingham, Alabama, around the end of October 1903 to a mainly colored audience. Here his reception was better. A reviewer said, "Tom McIntosh, that well-known colored comedian... is easily one of the best comedians on the stage, and regular critics say that he is a regular fun-maker, in other words, does not entirely depend on "horse play," etc. He made a good impression here, and the large audience of colored people expressed pleasure with his efforts." A review of the Smart Set performance in March 1904 in the Park Theatre, Indianapolis, was even more positive:

Tom McIntosh is chief in the comedy department; Mr. McIntosh seems to be funnier than ever, and from the time he meets his friend "Cain" until he is introduced into Hawaiian society, he keeps his audience in a pleasant uproar as "Geo. Washington Bullion," the millionaire. He leaves nothing undone to please...

Tom McIntosh died of a stroke in 1904 while traveling with the Smart Set Company.
