= Theodore Green =

Theodore Green is the name of:

- Theodore F. Green (1867–1966), American politician from Rhode Island
  - Rhode Island T. F. Green International Airport
- Theodore Green (horse trainer) (1925–1999), Australian race horse trainer
- Franklin Theodore Green (1863–1944), after whom Theodore Green Apothecary in San Francisco, US, is named

== See also ==
- Ted Greene (Theodore Greene, 1946–2005), American guitarist
- Ted Green (Edward Joseph "Terrible Ted" Green, 1940–2019), Canadian ice hockey player
- Ted Green (academic), British scientist
