= J. Edward Green =

J. Edward Green was an actor, playwright and production manager in the United States. He was born in New Albany, Indiana in 1871. In his early years, he was part of the Black American Troubadours, Black Patti's Troubadours, Scott's Real Refined Negro Minstrels, the King and Bush Colored Minstrels, and Rusco & Holland's Minstrels. He organized the Rag Time Opera Company in 1901 in Birmingham, Alabama, where he produced two musical plays, African Princes and Medicine Man. For several years, he was the straight man for Ernest Hogan, sometimes called the father of ragtime. In September 1906, Robert Motts hired Green to be the Director of Amusements at the Pekin Theatre, replacing Charles S. Sager. While there, he authored, directed, and acted in shows, staging works including musical comedies Captain Rufus, In Zululand, The Man from 'Bam, Mayor of Dixie, Two African Princes, Honolulu, Queen of the Jungles, Twenty Minutes from State Street, My Nephew's Wife, My Friend from Georgia, A Trip to Coontown, The Count of No Account, In Eululand, The Grafters and Doctor Dope. Doctor Dope was by Stanley Woods (playwright).

Green was described by a reviewer as picking out a stereotypical "foible of the Negro" to ridicule in his productions.

In 1910, Green and Marion Brooks established the Chester Amusement Company to present shows after The Pekin changed to a vaudeville house: '...this organization "operated" three theatres in Chicago and "booked" several others. "It was the eventual failure of this enterprise which contributed to [Green's] physical breakdown" and untimely death in 1910.' Green died in Chicago on February 21, 1910, of cerebral hemorrhage. His body was taken home to New Albany, Indiana, for burial on February 23. He was 39.
