= Sherman H. Dudley =

American entertainer and businessman (1872–1940)

Sherman Houston Dudley
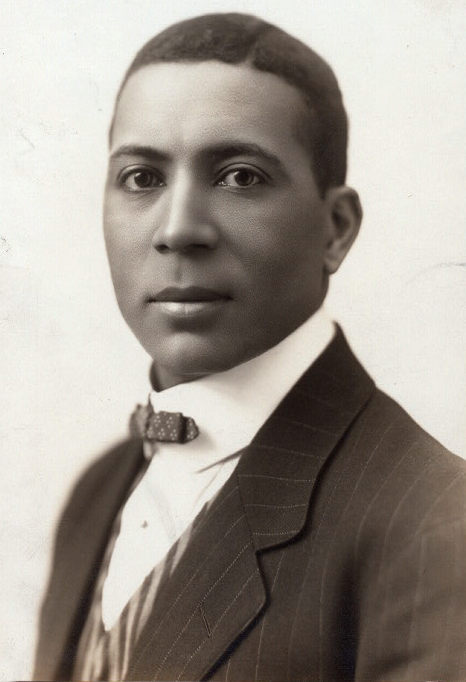
- Born: 1872
- Died: March 1, 1940 (aged 67–68)
- Other name: Lone Star Comedian
- Occupation: Vaudeville

Sherman Houston Dudley (1872 – March 1, 1940) was an African-American vaudeville performer and theatre entrepreneur. In the late nineteenth and early twentieth century he was a performer, composer of ragtime songs, and member and later owner of various minstrel shows including the Smart Set Company. Dudley was one of the first African Americans to combine business with theater, by starting a black theater circuit, in which theaters were owned or operated by African Americans and provided entertainment by and for African Americans. He created the first black operated vaudeville circuit and led the way for what became the Theatre Owners Booking Association (T.O.B.A.).

== Career ==
Reportedly, Dudley was born in 1872 in Dallas, Texas (some sources list his year of birth as around 1870 or 1873). "Of humble parentage", he was a jockey early in his youth. He turned to theater and gained a reputation by singing in a medicine show on a Dallas street corner, singing "Dese Bones G'wine Rise Again". By 1897 he had his own show, the "S. H. Dudley's Georgia Minstrels", who were performing in Galveston; later that same year he was on tour with P. T. Wright's Nashville Students Company. He gained a reputation for writing popular coon songs (including a hit song called "Mr. Coon, You'se Too Black For Me"), and performed with a number of minstrel comedians in shows in the same vein, including A Holiday in Coonville (his own production) and Coontown Golf Club (a production by Tom Brown and Sam Cousins). When he toured with Tom Brown and Billy Kersands in 1902, it was clear that he was a popular, well-known artist in the South, and was billed as "the Lone-Star comedian".

By 1903, he received star billing. In the summer of 1904 he left that company and moved to Chicago to take over the leading role in Gus Hill's Smart Set Company after the death of Tom McIntosh, performing in the show A Southern Enchantment. In 1904 he also opened a cafe and bar on State Street in Chicago with boxer Jack Johnson.

Dudley performed with the Smart Set for years with great success, though one critic, Sylvester Russell (a writer for the Indianapolis Freeman), was hard on him from the beginning, presumably because he felt that Dudley's minstrel show background made him unworthy; in 1906, Russell referred to him as "this loathsome comedian who hails from the Lone Star State." It seems that Dudley took all this in stride until 1911, when Russell made a comment about Dudley's son, after which Dudley beat him up "$5,000 worth", according to Russell; Dudley was arrested and fined $1 and court costs, after which Russell sued him for $5,000. Other critics were less hesitant to praise Dudley's performance, and he is now credited with having brought "the street to the stage". Dudley "revitalized the Smart Set and made it into an enduring classic of the American popular stage." In the next Smart Set show, The Black Politician (1906), Dudley got to use his jockey skills riding a horse on stage, and when in October 1906 a donkey named Shamus O'Brien was added (though another source lists the donkey's name as "Patrick"), the donkey and Dudley received high praise from critics, even from Russell.

In 1909, the Smart Set split up in a Northern and a Southern Smart Set, the first being directed by Dudley and the latter by his understudy, Salem Tutt Whitney; their 1909–10 production, His Honor, the Barber was written by a white playwright, Edwin Hanford, with music written for the show by black composers James Tim Brymn, Chris Smith, and James Burris. The show opened in New Jersey for a mixed audience, and by the time of the final run Aida Overton Walker had joined the cast. By this time, Dudley was widely known as the "Lone Star Comedian" and had begun to expand his business ventures, moving into theater in an attempt to have a black-owned and operated string of venues around the United States, a dream of his since at least 1907.

By about 1910 Dudley was based in Washington D.C., where he served as general manager and treasurer of the Colored Actors' Union. In 1911 he set up S. H. Dudley Theatrical Enterprises, and began buying and leasing theaters to develop the first black vaudeville circuit, initially around Washington and Virginia; he had bought his first theater, in Baltimore, in 1912. In August 1912, he played his last season with the Smart Set, from then on devoting himself to his "circuit of theaters." By 1916 the "Dudley Circuit" had extended into the south and Midwest, enabling black entertainers to secure longer term contracts for an extended season; his circuit provided the basis for the Theater Owners Booking Association (T.O.B.A.). His circuit was advertised in a weekly column published in black newspapers, "What's What on the Dudley's Circuit", and by 1914 it included over twenty theaters, "all owned or operated by blacks and as far south as Atlanta." T.O.B.A. was founded by people associated with Dudley's circuit, and while the organization was white-owned it had black regional managers, including Dudley (for the Washington, D.C. area).

After 1917 Dudley devoted himself to producing black musicals, including updated Smart Set productions.

He sold his theaters around 1930 (due to economic forces "beyond his control"), and retired to a farm in Maryland where he bred thoroughbred racehorses.

== Personal life ==
In 1903 Dudley married Alberta Ormes, with whom he'd been performing since at least 1901, and was on tour the following year with Richard and Pringle's Georgia Minstrels. Alberta was murdered in 1926 by Police George S. Davis. Articles stated the couple had been in the midst of a divorce, but had recently reconciled.

Actor Sherman H. Dudley Jr. was his son.

== Filmography ==
- Easy Money (1922)

== See also ==
- Black Vaudeville
