= McFadden's Flats (1935 film) =

1935 film by Ralph Murphy

- Directed by: Ralph Murphy
- Screenplay by: Arthur Caesar; Edward Kaufman; Andy Rice; Casey Robinson
- Produced by: Charles R. Rogers
- Starring: Walter C. Kelly; Andy Clyde; Richard Cromwell; Jane Darwell; Betty Furness; George Barbier; Phyllis Brooks
- Cinematography: Ben F. Reynolds
- Edited by: Joseph Kane
- Music by: John Leipold
- Production company: Paramount Pictures
- Distributed by: Paramount Pictures
- Release date: March 29, 1935
- Running time: 65 minutes
- Country: United States
- Language: English

McFadden's Flats is a 1935 American comedy film directed by Ralph Murphy and written by Arthur Caesar, Edward Kaufman, Andy Rice and Casey Robinson. The film stars Walter C. Kelly, Andy Clyde, Richard Cromwell, Jane Darwell, Betty Furness, George Barbier and Phyllis Brooks. The film was released on March 29, 1935, by Paramount Pictures.

== Cast ==
- Walter C. Kelly as Dan McFadden
- Andy Clyde as Jock McTavish
- Richard Cromwell as Sandy MacTavish
- Jane Darwell as Nora McFadden
- Betty Furness as Molly McFadden
- George Barbier as Mr. Hall
- Phyllis Brooks as Mary Ellis Hall
- Howard Wilson as Robert Hall
- Nella Walker as Mrs. Hall
- Frederick Burton as Jefferson
