= Princess Wee Wee =

Tap dancer and vaudeville performer

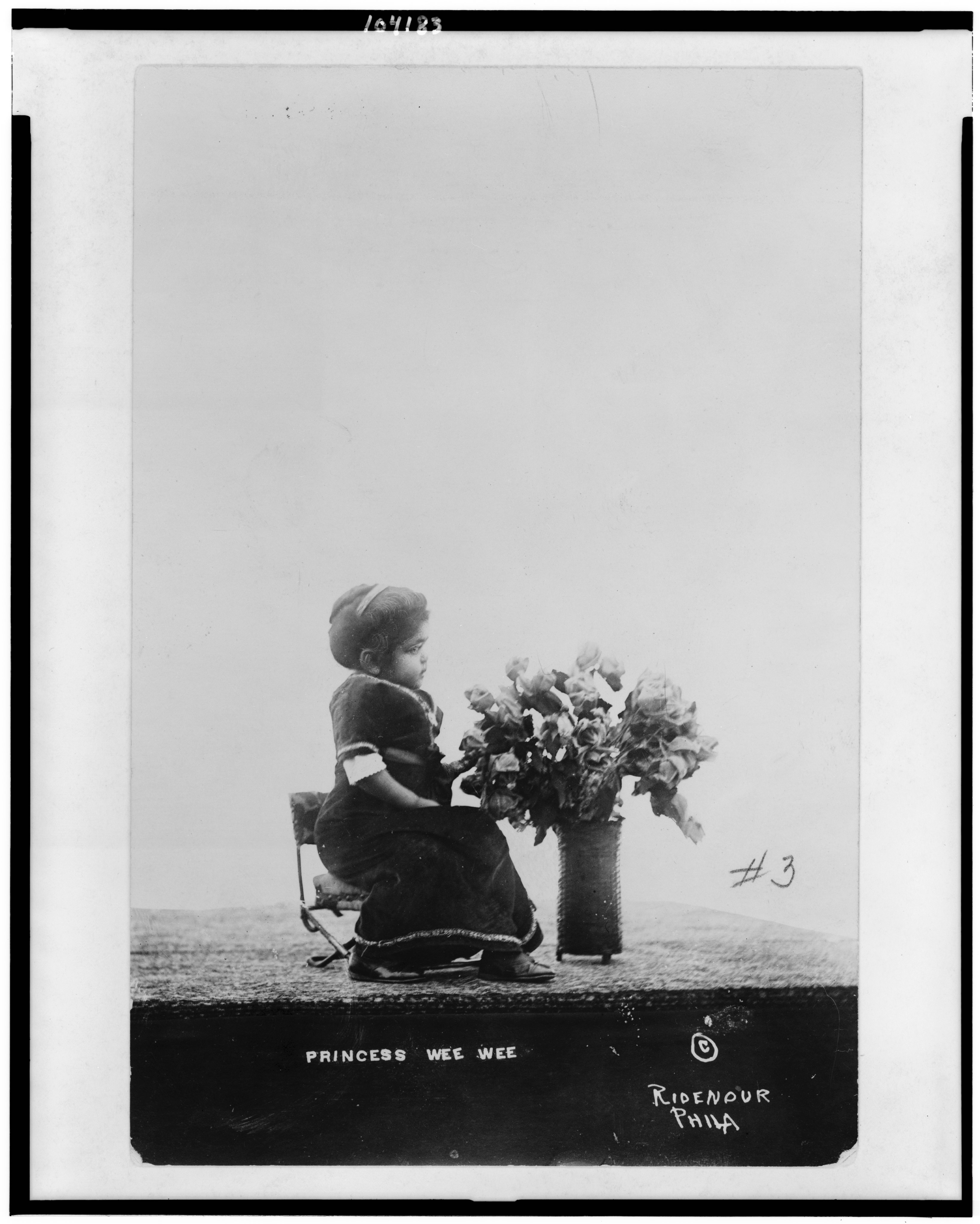
- Pictured circa 1915
- Born: Harriet Elizabeth Thompson c 1890s Bryn Mawr, Pennsylvania
- Died: unknown
- Other names: Princess Weenie Wee, Princess Pee Wee, The Animated Chocoloate Éclair
- Occupations: circus performer and dancer
- Years active: 1908–1940s
- Employer(s): Ringling Brothers and Barnum & Bailey Circus; Whitman Sisters
- Height: Disputed
- Spouse(s): William Matthews; Ralph Franco (married 1929, annulled 1930)

Princess Wee Wee was the stage name of Harriet Elizabeth Thompson Williams Franco (born c. 1890), an African-American dancer and performer with dwarfism. Thompson was well known in her time as a singing and dancing star of sideshows, circuses and later, black vaudeville in a career that lasted nearly four decades. Noted for her diminutive height, Williams transitioned from being a sideshow act to a reputable tap dancer and singer, later performing for two US Presidents and European royalty.

== Early life ==
Harriet Thompson was born in Bryn Mawr, Pennsylvania, in the early 1890s. Not long after her birth, her parents moved to Baltimore, Maryland, where they lived in the city's Westside neighborhood. She had at least one sister who was of average height.

== Career ==
=== Sideshow act ===
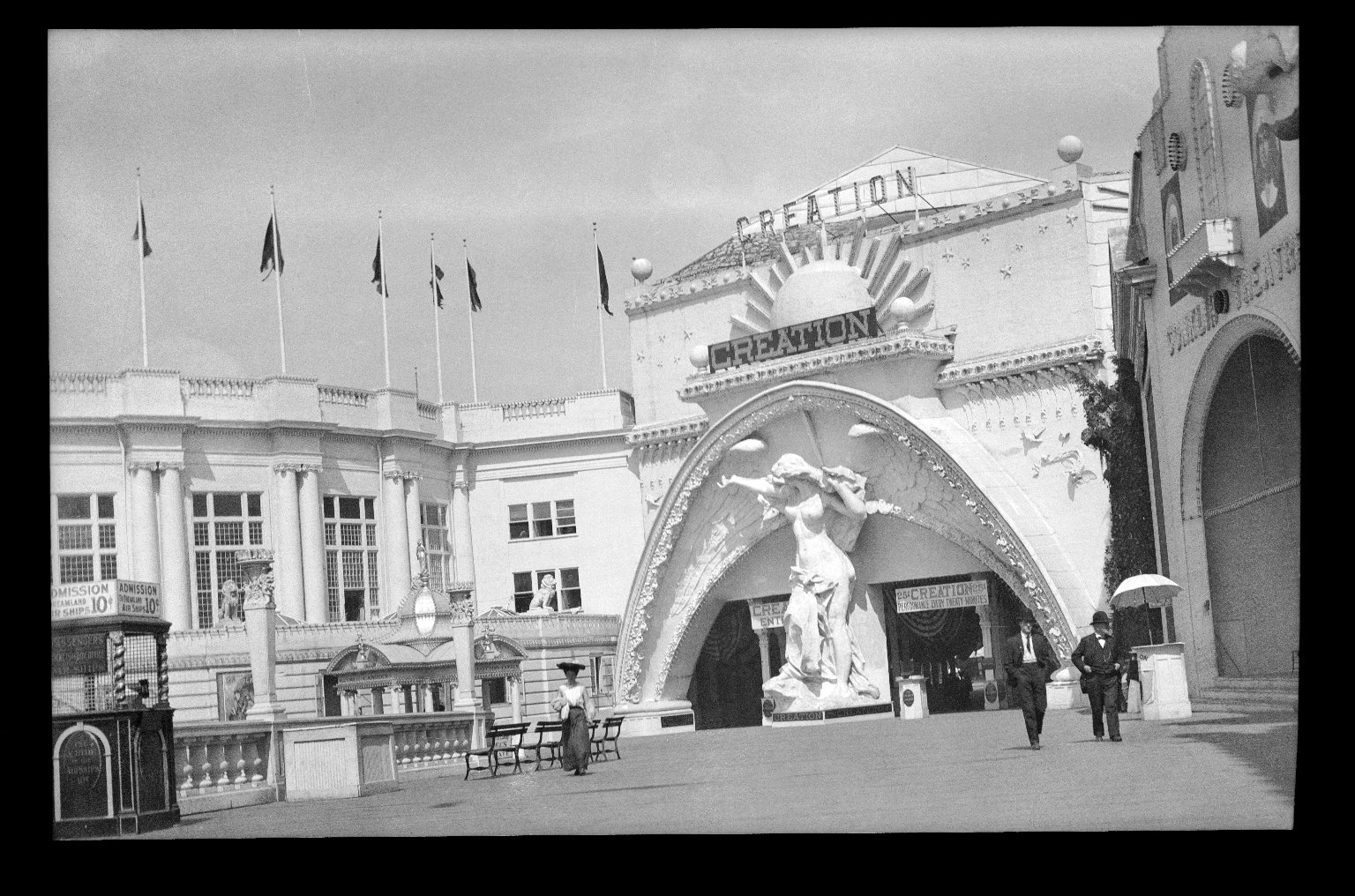
Dreamland, pictured 1907

Thompson became involved in show business at a young age. Her earliest appearances are recorded in 1907 when she was purportedly 18 years old.

In January 1908, Thompson's father, James Thompson brokered a $15,000 deal with showman Robert M. Chambers for a nationwide tour. In March, Otto, John, and Charles Ringling persuaded James Thompson to break his contract with Chambers, and "Princess Wee" joined the employ of the Ringling Brothers and Barnum & Bailey Circus. Later, Chambers would sue Ringling for the broken contract.

Harriet Thompson quickly headed to New York and began appearing at Madison Square Garden and at the Dreamland Circus Sideshow on Coney Island. She was said to be afraid of children, but perfectly comfortable with the menagerie of the circus, pictured atop the exhibition's resident elephant.

From 1908 to 1909, Thompson was showcased in an exhibition of the Congress of the World's Greatest Curiosities alongside "Jolly Trixie the Queen of Fatland" for an admission price of 10 cents. While at Coney Island, she sold carte-de-viste featuring a picture of herself dressed in an elegant evening gown and accompanied by her manager, showcasing her small stature. By the time the Dreamland Amusement park burned down, Thompson had begun taking her sideshow act on the road. In 1910 she was a featured performer for Patterson Amusements as the bride of "Hop the Frog Boy" touring fair grounds around the United States.

=== Circus performer ===
In 1911, she began travelling the country with Ringling Brothers, where she was advertised as "the world's smallest lady". Outside of the circus season, Thompson toured with a group of sideshow performers.

It was during her time at the circus she came under the tutelage of James Wolfscale, the circus's bandmaster who taught her to sing and dance. By 1916, the "hit of the Freak Department at Madison Square Garden" had become a noted tap dancer and singer. That year, James Wolfscale organized a travelling show for the vaudeville circuit to run during the circus's off season. Princess Wee Wee was a featured performer in the show, Moonlight on the Levee. There, she performed the finale and by 1917, was receiving top billing. The show, which toured after the circus season was billed as "Princess Wee Wee and her Jass Band Company".

In late 1917, she was said to have left the employ of the Barnum & Bailey circus. In 1918, she became the secretary of the "Freaks War Saving Society to Kill, Can, or Cage the Kaiser" organization an effort by Ringling's performers to support the war effort.

=== Size ===
There are many different reports for Thompsons's height and weight, often exaggerated for effect. In an early description, Wee Wee was said to stand 17 inches high and weigh only 12 pounds. In comparison, on Coney Island, she was advertised as weighing 49 pounds and standing 34 inches tall. At the time of her marriage to Williams, she was reportedly "three foot two." Other reports when she was dancing in vaudeville estimate her height at "scarcely a yard high".

=== Whitman Sisters ===
By 1925, she joined the Whitman Sisters travelling show as a singer and featured dancer. She toured with the Whitman Sisters at least until the close of the ensemble. On stage she was accompanied by what some accounts refer to as her "husband", dance partner "Prince Arthur". In other performances she partnered with "Prince Albert", the child tap star son of Alice Whitman.

In 1926, she visited the White House to entertain Calvin Coolidge, who reportedly expressed great pleasure to meet Wee Wee. That year, she performed a song and dance routine with a young Willie Bryant in the Whitman Sisters' show, where she danced between his legs.

=== Solo act and later years ===
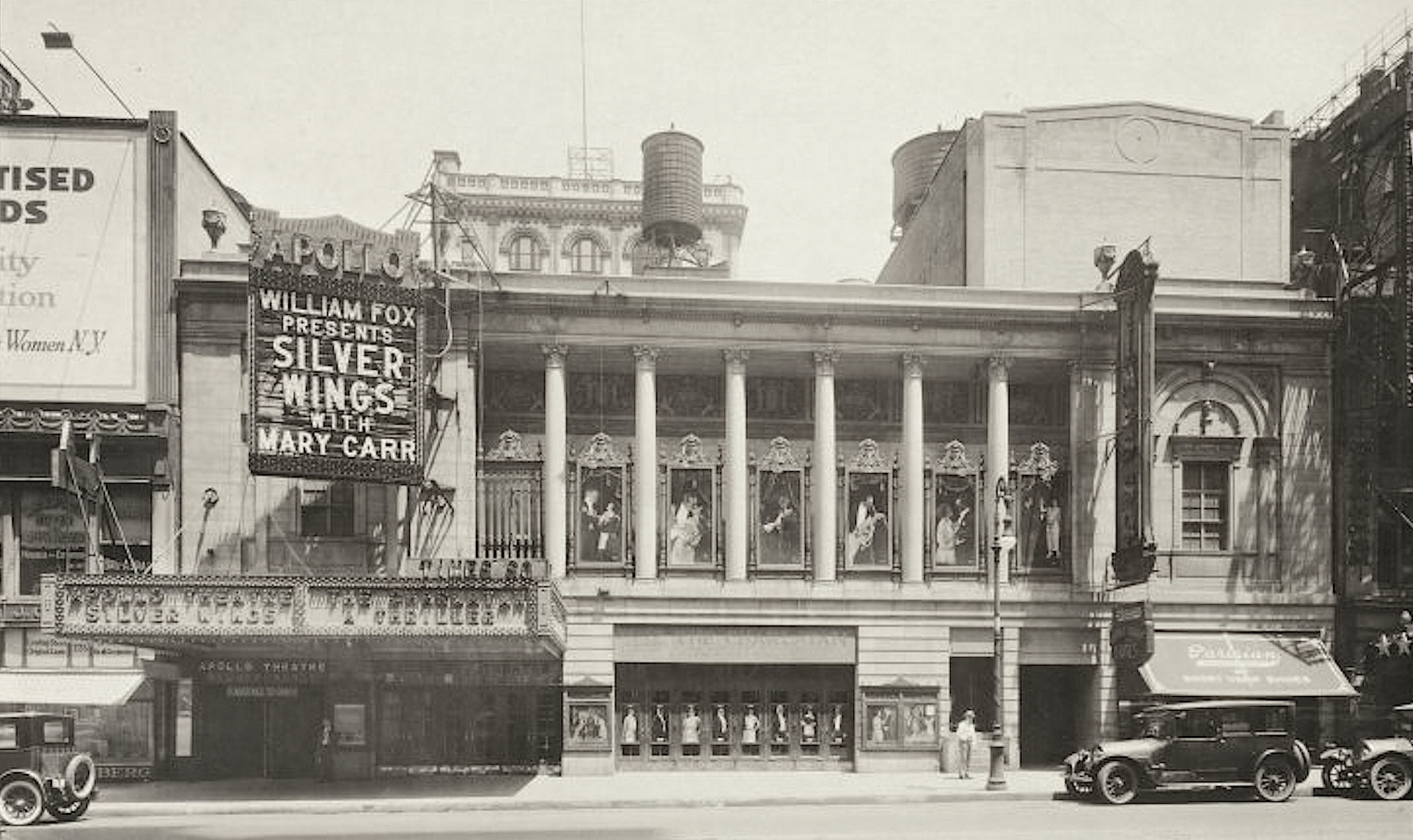
Apollo Theatre, pictured in 1922.

In the 1930s, she toured as a featured performer with Essie and Alice Whitman in shows across the United States, including at New York's Apollo Theater. By this time she had spent the last three decades in show business and reportedly moved to California. Following the release of films featuring actors with dwarfism, including The Wizard of Oz and The Terror of Tiny Town, Thompson was vocal about becoming involved in the film industry. Reports at the time suggested that a film part was being written for her, but it is unclear if she ever appeared on film.

The Whitman Sisters show ended in 1942 with the death of the troupe's leader and manager. In 1943 she was featuring at the Potter Hotel Club in Harrisburg, Pennsylvania. Details about Thompson's later years are unrecorded.

== Marketing and public image ==
Throughout her nearly four-decade career, the way Thompson was promoted changed considerably. When she entered show business as a teenager in the late 1900s, promoters emphasized her diminutive stature above all else, advertising her as the "smallest living woman", the "world's smallest lady", and the "world's most diminutive colored woman in all of show business". She was variously billed as "Princess Wee Wee", "Princess Weenie Wee", "Princess Pee Wee", and "The Animated Chocolate Éclair", while promotional material frequently gave conflicting accounts of her height and weight.

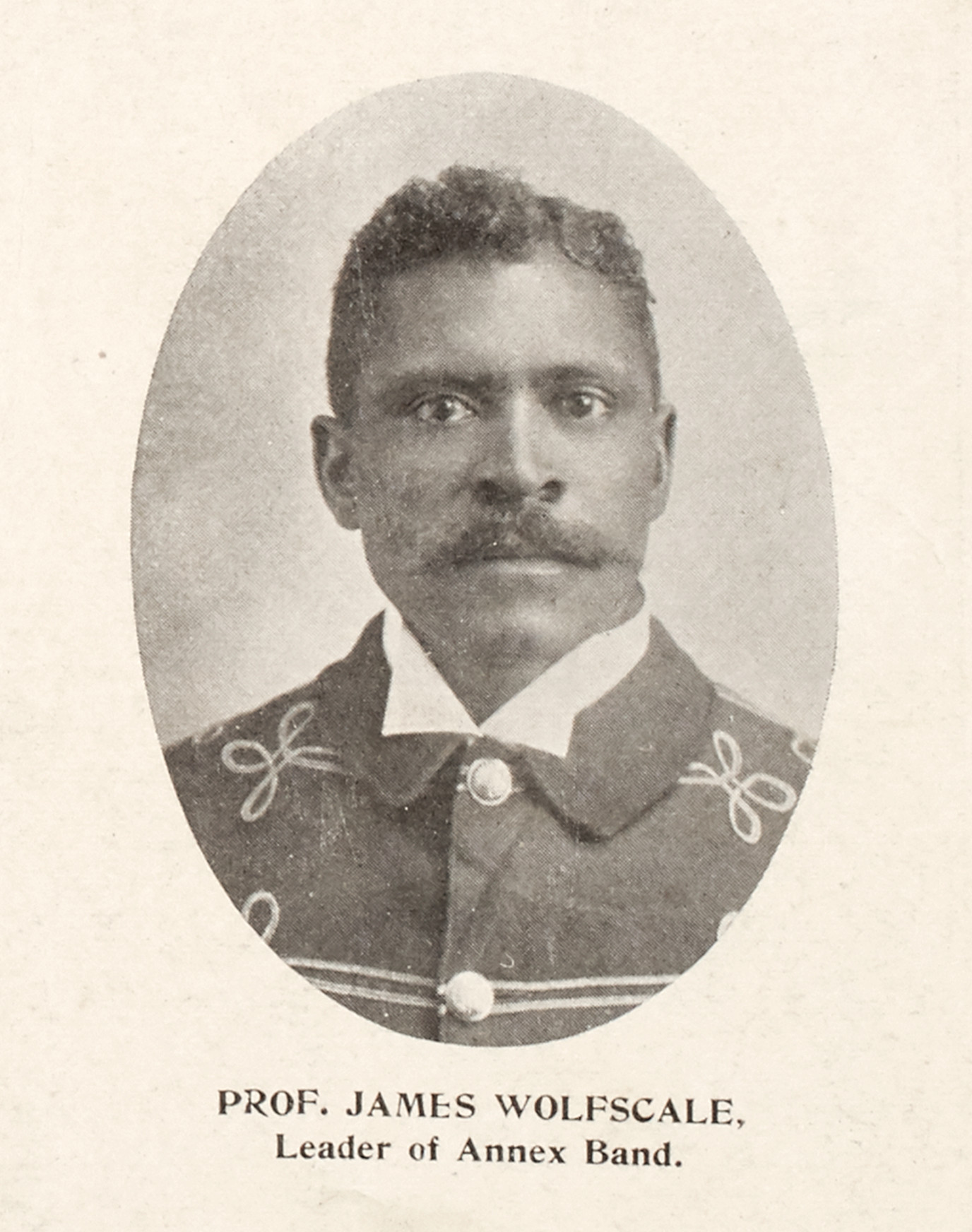
James Wolfscale, Band Leader

During her early sideshow years at Dreamland on Coney Island and with the Ringling Brothers and Barnum & Bailey Circus, Thompson was promoted as both a novelty attraction and an elegantly dressed performer. She was described as a "doll lady", photographed atop the park's resident elephant, and sold souvenir cartes-de-visite depicting her in formal evening dress, emphasizing the contrast between her refined appearance and her diminutive stature. Newspaper coverage reinforced this image through exaggerated descriptions of her size.

By her mid-20s, advertisements increasingly highlighted Thompson's singing and tap dancing rather than her stature alone. Under the guidance of James Wolfscale, she received top billing in productions such as Moonlight on the Levee and later as the star of "Princess Wee Wee and her Jass Band Company". By the 1930s, after more than 20 years on stage, newspaper reviews praised her singing, dancing and stage presence rather than focusing primarily on her height.

== Marriage and relationships ==
While touring with the Ringling Brothers and Barnum & Bailey Circus in her early 20s, Thompson married William Matthews, a singer from Newark, New Jersey, who was reported to stand 4 feet 10 inches (147 cm) tall. Contemporary sources do not record when or how the marriage ended.

By her mid-30s, while performing with the Whitman Sisters, Thompson appeared on stage with the dancer known as "Prince Arthur". Some newspaper accounts described him as her husband, while others identified him simply as her dance partner. During the late 1920s and 1930s, she also performed with "Prince Albert", the young tap dancer and son of Alice Whitman.

At about age 40, Thompson married Baltimore theatre promoter Ralph Franco on 9 October 1929. The marriage lasted less than a year. In 1930, she successfully obtained an annulment after alleging that Franco had made her "tipsy" and fraudulently induced her to marry him with the intention of taking her away from the Whitman Sisters show. No subsequent marriages are documented in the surviving sources.
