= Florence Hines =

American vaudeville entertainer

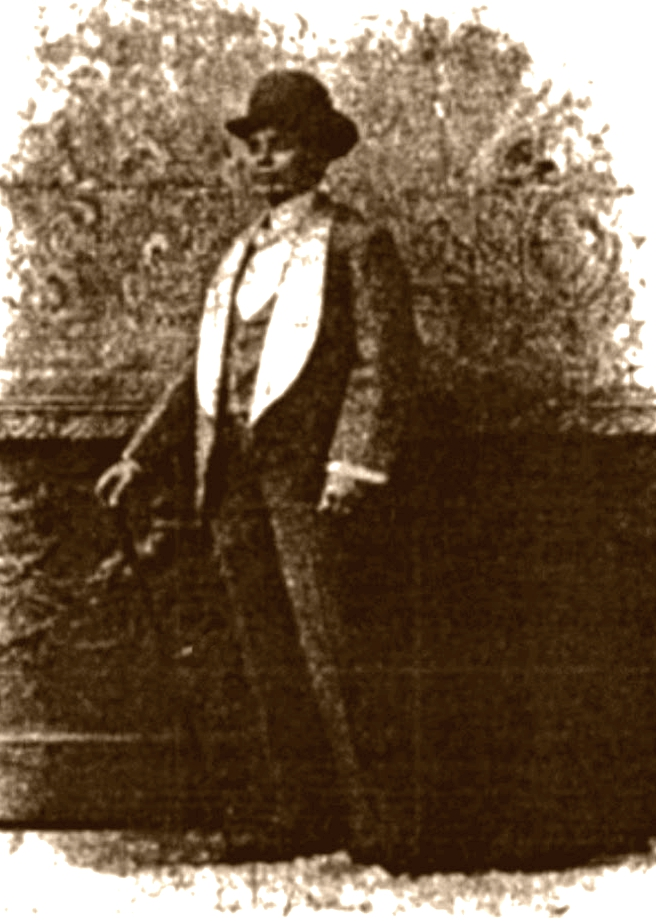
- Born: c. 1868; Ohio, U.S.
- Died: March 10, 1924 (aged 55–56)
- Resting place: Santa Rosa, California
- Occupations: male impersonator, vaudeville performer

Florence Hines (1868–1924) was a Black American vaudeville entertainer who was best known for performing throughout the United States in the 1890s as a male impersonator with Sam T. Jack's Creole Burlesque show. In her heyday, she was described as 'the greatest living female song and dance artist" and 'the queen of all male impersonators". Her career was noteworthy for breaking existing minstrel stereotypes and portraying Black men in a more positive light, as well as for setting high standards for the Black female comedians and blues singers who followed her.

== Early life and career ==
Florence Hines was born about 1868 in Ohio. Little is documented of Hines' early life, or how she became an entertainer. The earliest mentions of her as a performer appear in 1890, when she performed with the Sam T. Jack Creole Show. The Creole Show was an all-black review which featured singers and tableau artists as well as comedians. Florence Hines, with her male impersonation act, was the master of ceremonies and a star of the show. She was also a singer, a dancer, a comedic 'conversationalist' and a burlesque performer in a group tableau called "Beauty of the Nile, or Doomed by Fire," which she later directed.

The Creole Show was created when Buffalo Bill Cody made a $1,000 bet with his friend Sam T Jack, a white Chicago entrepreneur, that "the African could never shine upon the stage". Jack accepted the bet, and hired a group of Black performers who not only allowed Jack to collect his $1,000 but went on to perform sold-out shows across the country. The Black press of the time wrote that Hines and her co-star Florence Briscoe in the groundbreaking show "gave a new impression of the possibilities of our girls in show business".

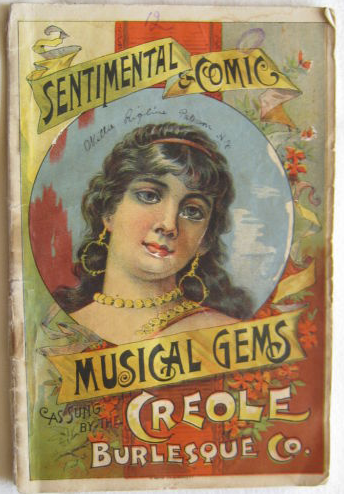
Cover of a book of songs published by the Creole Burlesque Company

By 1896, the Creole Show had a firmly established reputation, whose entertainers traveled in their own $15,000 palace hotel car. "It serves its legitimate purpose for which it was originally conceived," wrote the Fort Wayne Journal Gazette, " that of introducing a new type of beauty and native artists, and retaining its novelty by the introduction of new ideas; it is still one of the most popular attractions of the day.' In the Creole Show, black entertainers had a venue where they were able to perform for the first time "racially-grounded" comedy that was not filled with derogatory stereotypes of black people.

In her early days, Hines commanded the largest salary paid to a Black female performer. Wearing a tuxedo with tails, cane, cape and top hat, Hines crossed racial, social and gender barriers in her portrayal of the Black dandy, breaking with previous poor and illiterate minstrel show stereotypes of Black men. The songs she sang, which emphasized the dandy's material wealth, included “For I’m the Lad That’s Made of Money”, “I Can’t See My Money Go That Way” and “A Millionaire’s Only Son”.

Hines worked with the Creole Show for seven seasons, sometimes performing a singing duet with Marie Roberts. She was described as 'the greatest living female song and dance artist:" and 'the queen of all male impersonators".

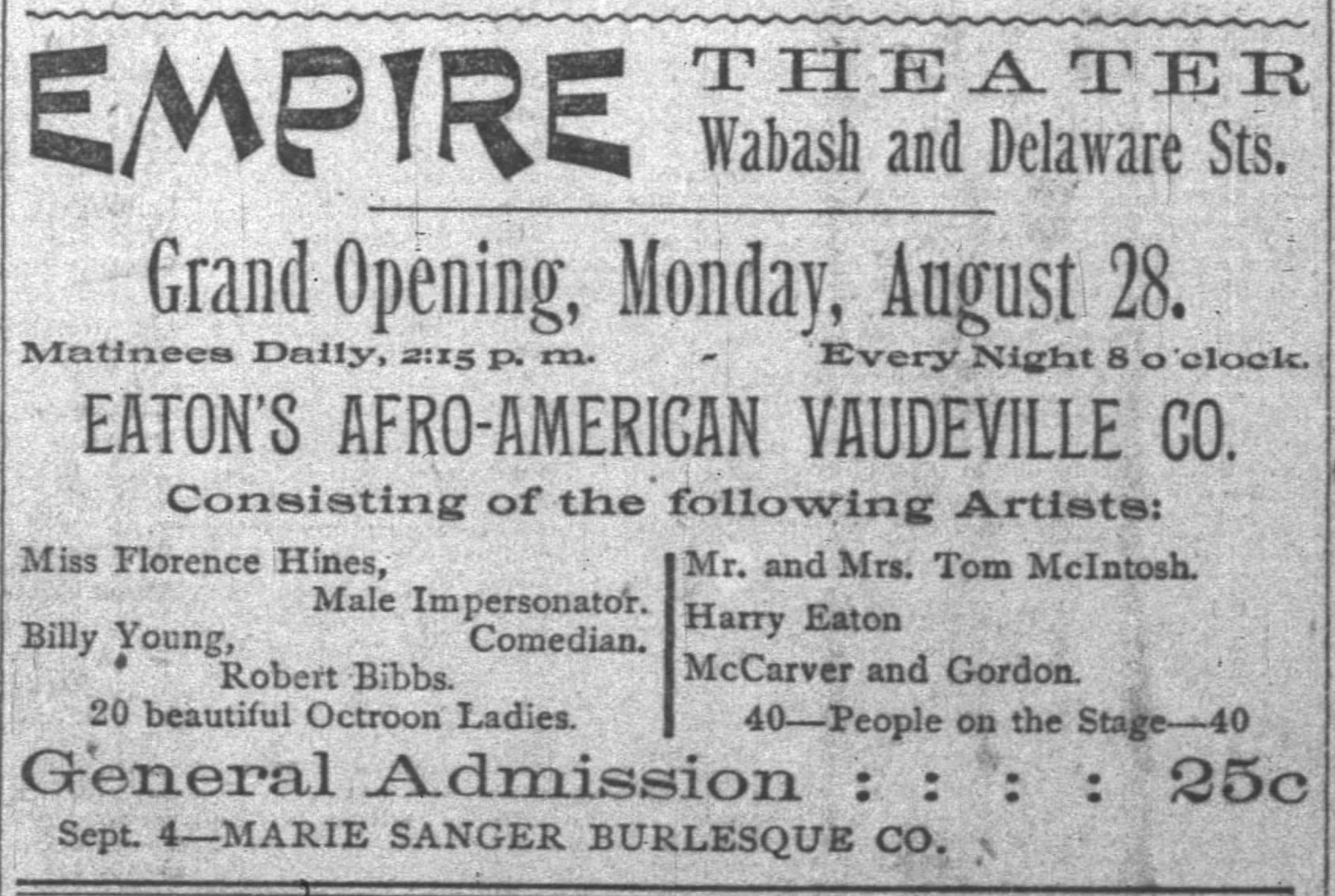
1893 Indianapolis News advertisement for Eaton's Afro-American Vaudeville Company, featuring Florence Hines and others

The Creole show was not the only show Hines worked for. In 1893, Hines also performed as a male impersonator with Eaton's Afro-American Vaudeville Company, managed by Black comedian and entrepreneur Harry S. Eaton. In 1896, she was one of the many celebrity performers in a "wildly successful" touring company called Darkest America that traveled fourteen states and included Sam Lucas and Billy Miller. Two years later, she entertained a full house with the Big Afro American Company, where she was featured along with male soprano Sylvester Russell.

== Personal life ==
In 1892, a dressing room fight broke out between Hines and her duet partner, Marie Roberts. Their co-workers were able to break up the fight. "The utmost intimacy has existed between the two women for the past year," said the Cincinnati press, 'their marked devotion being not only noticeable but a subject of comment among their associates of the stage." The article went on to assume that because of the 'lovable' nature of their onstage duet, they would smooth out their differences.

The following year, Hines and a female co-star were insulted and then assaulted by a man named William Brown as they finished their performance at the Olympia Theater in New York and were trying to catch a cable car. Brown knocked them both into the gutter, where their faces were cut. He was fined ten dollars.

The press coverage of the fight between Hines and Roberts led later historians to speculate that Florence Hines was a lesbian. Census records in 1920 indicate that Hines was widowed and living with her 38-year-old-daughter and son-in-law in Salem, Oregon.

== Later life and death ==
Hines continued to do solo shows in the early 20th century. A 1904 article in the Indianapolis Freeman reviewed a 'quieter' performance of Hines which involved her whistling, and said the performance was good even though Hines was not in good health. Hines, it said, was looking forward to resuming her male impersonation work.

By 1920, Hines had become a preacher in Salem Oregon, according to a letter from a vaudeville entertainer in The Chicago Defender. The Defender noted in 1923 that Hines, "recognized as the greatest male impersonator of all times and all races", had been paralyzed and an invalid since 1906.

In 1924, a woman named Nunnie Williams, who said she was Hines' daughter, wrote a letter to The Chicago Defender that said Hines had died on March 10 and been buried on March 24 in Santa Rosa, California. In the letter, she described Hines as "the mother of colored show business."

== Legacy ==
Twenty-first century scholars and historians have written that African American male impersonators like Hines gave a more positive spin to the Black dandy that was often ridiculed by white performers: Hines' performance, wrote historian Henry Elam, made the dandy "into a jazz age sophisticate, resplendent in top coat tails, twirling a cane and donning a top hat."

The early performances of Hines and other Black female performers of the Vaudeville era, wrote Lynn Abbott in Out of Sight: The Rise of African American Popular Music, set a high standard for the blues era performers that followed them:

"These pioneering female performers had an impact on the manner in which blues singing was introduced on the black vaudeville stage by the blues women of the 1910s and 20s. Hines' male impersonations provided the standard against which African American comediennes were compared for decades. She may have directly inspired such blues era performers as Lillyn Brown, the original Bessie Brown and Alberta Whitman."

== See also ==
- Gladys Bentley
- Black Vaudeville
- List of drag kings
