= Tap dance =

Type of dance involving percussive shoes

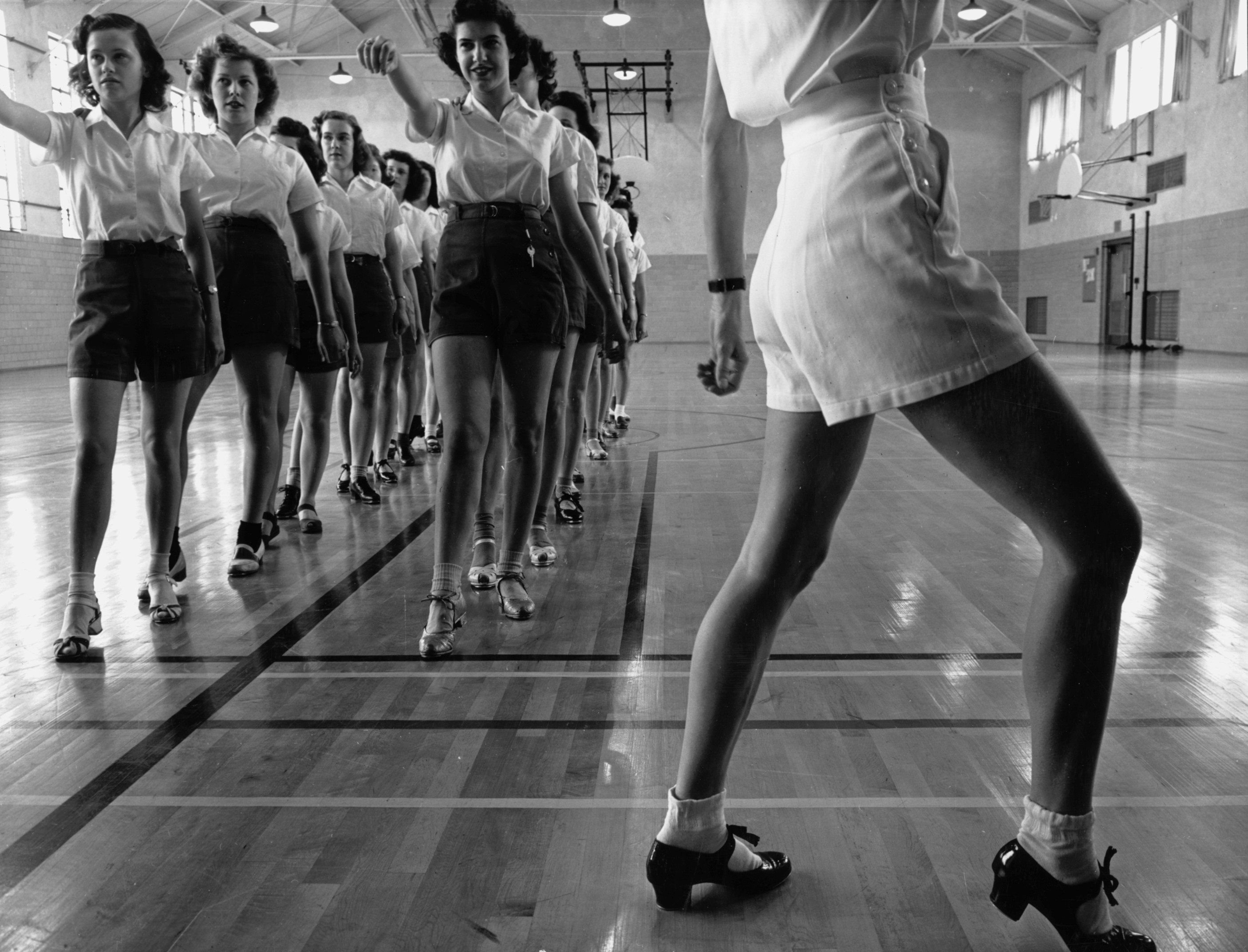
Tap dancing class at Iowa State College, 1942

Tap dance (or tap) is a form of dance originating from the United States in which the dancers use sounds of tap shoes striking the floor as a form of percussion; it is often accompanied by music. Tap dancing can also be performed with no musical accompaniment; the sound of the taps is its own music.

Tap is a type of step dance that began with the combination of Black American and Irish dance traditions, such as the juba dance and Irish step dances. The fusion of African rhythms and performance styles with European techniques of footwork led to the creation of tap dance. This fusion began in the mid-17th century but did not become popular until the mid-19th century. In the 20th century, it evolved alongside jazz music.

There are two major versions of tap dance: rhythm (jazz) tap and Broadway tap. Broadway tap focuses on dance; it is widely performed in musical theater. Rhythm tap focuses on musicality, and practitioners consider themselves to be a part of the jazz tradition.

The sound is made by shoes that have a metal "tap" on the heel and toe. Different shoes may differ in their sound.

== History ==
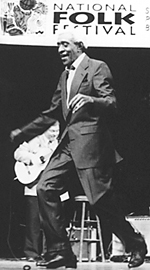
Jimmy Slyde tap dancing

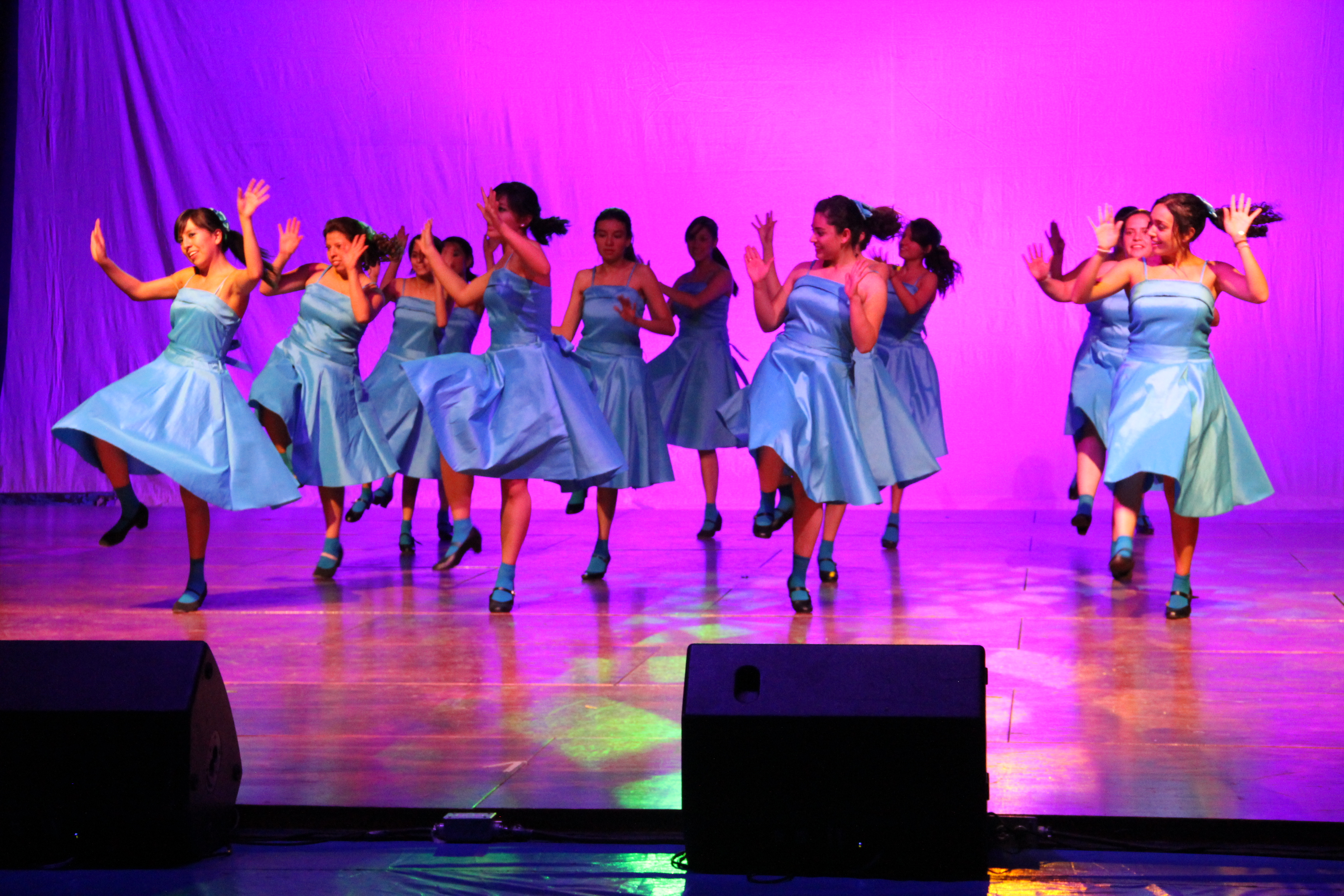
Students performing a tap dance in Mexico City

Tap dance has roots in Central African, West African, and Western European musical and step dance traditions. During the 17th – 19th centuries, it developed from the blending of the Central African djouba, and the Irish jig and the Welsh clog, that were brought to the North American continent by immigrants. These fused and evolved into a form of dance called "jigging", which was taken up by both black and white minstrel show dancers in the 1800s. Tap dance then became a popular stage entertainment.

As minstrel shows began to decline in popularity, tap dance moved to the increasingly popular Vaudeville stage. Due to Vaudeville's unspoken "two-colored rule", which forbade black people from performing solo, many Vaudeville tap acts were duets. One such duo was "Buck and Bubbles," which consisted of John "Bubbles" Sublett tap dancing and Ford "Buck" Washington playing a piano. The duo performed a "Class Act", a routine in which the performers wore tuxedos, effectively distinguishing them from the older minstrel show concept of tap dancers as "grinning-and-dancing clowns."

Another notable figure during this period is Bill "Bojangles" Robinson, a protégé of Alice Whitman of The Whitman Sisters around 1904 (then known as "Willie Robinson"). Well versed in both Buck and Wing dancing and Irish Step dancing, Robinson joined the Vaudeville circuit in 1902 in a duo with George W. Cooper. The act quickly became famous, headlining events across the country, and touring England as well. In 1908, the partnership ended and Robinson began dancing solo, which was extremely rare for a black man at that time. Despite this, he had tremendous success and soon became a world-famous celebrity. He went on to have a leading role in many films, notably in the Shirley Temple franchise.

Shortly thereafter, the Nicholas Brothers came on the scene. Consisting of real life brothers Fayard and Harold, this team wowed audiences with their acrobatic feats incorporated into their classy style of dancing. A notable scene in the movie "Stormy Weather" features the pair dancing up a staircase and then descending the staircase in a series of leapfrogs over each other into a full split from which they rise with no hands. "Stormy Weather" was a six-minute performance performed in one go with no retakes. The Nicholas Brothers danced on pianos and many other structures during this performance.

During the 1930s, tap dance mixed with Lindy Hop. "Flying swing outs" and "flying circles" are Lindy Hop moves with tap footwork. In the mid-to-late 1950s, the style of entertainment changed. Jazz music and tap dance declined, while rock and roll and the new jazz dance emerged. What is called jazz dance evolved out of tap dance, so both dances have many moves in common. But jazz evolved separately from tap dance to become a new form in its own right. Well known dancers during the 1960s and 1970s included Arthur Duncan and Tommy Tune.

No Maps on My Taps, the Emmy award-winning PBS documentary of 1979, helped begin the recent revival of tap dance. The outstanding success of the animated film, Happy Feet, has further reinforced the popular appeal. National Tap Dance Day in the United States, celebrated May 25, was signed into law by President George Bush on November 7, 1989. (May 25 was chosen because it is the birthday of famous tapper Bill "Bojangles" Robinson.)

Prominent modern tap dancers have included Gregory and Maurice Hines, Sarah Reich, Brenda Bufalino, Melinda Sullivan, The Clark Brothers, James "Buster" Brown, Savion Glover, LaVaughn Robinson, Jason Samuels Smith, Chloe Arnold, Michelle Dorrance, Dormeshia Sumbry-Edwards, Ayodele Casel, and Dianne "Lady Di" Walker. Indie-pop band Tilly and the Wall also features a tap dancer, Jamie Pressnall, tapping as percussion.

One recent innovation in the world of tap dance is the development of the long form "tap opera," which tells an entire story during single performance, similar to a story ballet. This format was initially developed by Mark Yonally, founder and artistic director of dance company Chicago Tap Theatre in the early 2000s.

== Segregation's impact ==
During the 1930s and the 1940s, Americans were able to watch tap dancers perform on film. However, black tap dancers found it difficult to be a part of white films because segregation was prominent in America. This led to the creation of two different styles of tap dance: white tap dancers evolved up to a Broadway style and black dancers continued with the traditional rhythm based style. Broadway tap dance was performed in mainly Broadway musicals and film, and it did not emphasize classic jazz rhythms. Rhythm tap integrated more of the classic African roots of tap dance, and it emphasized jazz rhythms, musicality, and improvisation.

There was also the "two-color rule," which made sure that black tap dancers were not able to perform solos onstage. This led to some tap dancers performing comedic tap duets. There were stereotypes placed on black Americans such as the "Uncle Tom" stereotype, and many tap dancers were forced to wear "black-face" onstage to perform. One of the first black tap dancers to be acknowledged by America was Bill "Bojangles" Robinson, who performed duets with Shirley Temple. However, Bill Robinson's career was reduced to "minstrelsy," which can be defined as white performers using makeup to mock black culture or using black stereotypes in a performance. Black Americans joined these minstrel performances, where they would be forced to act on black stereotypes in their performances. James "Buster" Brown, got his start in the segregated clubs of the 1930s, but eventually earned international mainstream recognition and mentored younger more modern tap dancers in the 1990s.

== Characteristics ==
(video) A man practices tap dancing in front of a station in Japan.

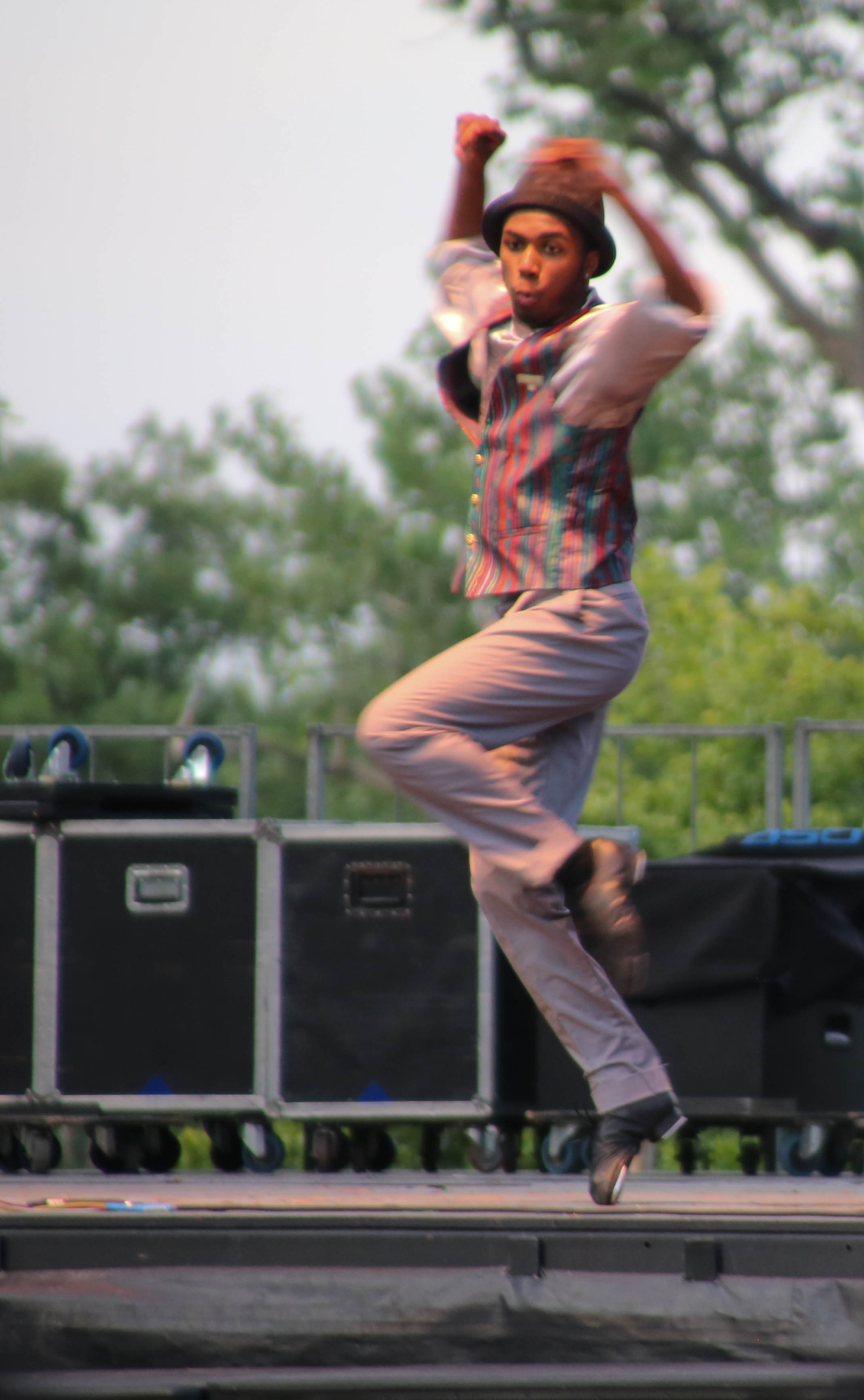
A teen tap dancer is performing a tap step known as a "toe stand" onstage.

Tap dancers make frequent use of syncopation. Choreography typically starts on the eighth or first beat count. Another aspect of tap dancing is improvisation. Tap dancing can either be done with music following the beats provided, or without musical accompaniment; the latter is known as "a cappella" tap dancing.

Hoofers are tap dancers who dance primarily "closer to the floor", using mostly footwork and not showing very much arm or body movement. This kind of tap dancing, also called rhythm tap, was employed by slaves in America.

Steve Condos developed an innovative rhythmic tap style that influenced the work of later tap dancers such as Gregory Hines and Savion Glover. The majority of early hoofers, such as Sammy Davis Jr., Glover, Hines, and LaVaughn Robinson were African American men. Savion Glover helped bring tap dance into mainstream media by choreographing Happy Feet, a film about a tap dancing penguin. Another well-known tap film is 1989's Tap, starring Gregory Hines and many old-time hoofers.

Early tappers like Fred Astaire provided a more ballroom look to tap dancing, while Gene Kelly introduced ballet elements and style into tap. This style of tap led to what is today known as Broadway style, which is popular in American culture. It often involves high heeled tap shoes and show music, and is usually the type of tap first taught to beginners. Examples of this style are found in Broadway musicals such as Anything Goes and 42nd Street.

"Soft-Shoe" is a rhythm form of tap dancing that does not require special shoes, and though rhythm is generated by tapping of the feet, it also uses sliding of the feet (even sometimes using scattered sand on the stage to enhance the sound of sliding feet) more often than modern rhythm tap. It preceded what is currently considered to be modern tap, but has since declined in popularity.

=== Tap steps ===
Basic tap steps are known as "one-sound steps" and are either weight shifting or non-weight-shifting steps. Common basic tap steps include heel drops, toe drops, heel digs, toe taps, a brush, scuff, chug, pull, hop, leap and step.

In advanced tap dancing, basic steps are often combined to create new steps. Many steps also have single, double, and triple variations, or can have a variation with a pickup, which is essentially adding an additional brush sound. Popular steps with many variations include pullbacks, timesteps, riffs, and drawbacks.

Time steps is an umbrella term that is widely used in tap for any combination of steps that follows a specific rhythm or pattern. These consist of a rhythm that is changed to make new time steps by adding or removing steps. There are many variations of the basic time step, including the single, double, and triple time steps. Time steps consist of single- and multi-sound step combinations.

In tap, various types of turns can be done, including step heel turns, Maxi Ford turns, cramp-roll turns, and drag turns. All tap turns can be practiced in both directions.

Other common tap steps include the shuffle, shuffle ball change, double shuffle, leap shuffle, flap, flap ball change, running flaps, flap heel, cramp-roll, buffalo, Maxi Ford, Maxi Ford with a pullback, pullbacks, wings, Cincinnati, the shim sham shimmy (also called the Lindy), Irish, Waltz Clog, the paddle roll, the paradiddle, stomp, brushes, scuffs, spanks, single and double toe punches, hot steps, heel clicks, toe stands, over-the-tops, military time step, back to broadway, toe stand turns, New Yorkers, Tag Annies and Shiggy Bops.

== Tap shoes ==
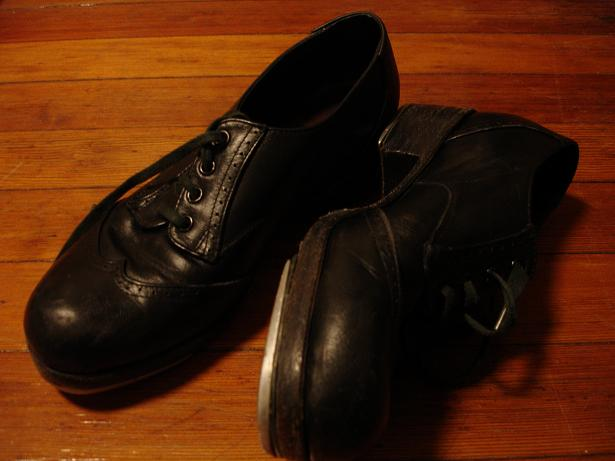
Tap shoes

In the earliest years of tap dancing, tap shoes often had wooden soles. The soles of modern tap shoes are either full-sole or split-sole. A full-sole tap shoe has a continuous base material along the underside of the shoes; a split-sole tap shoe has a gap in the base material under the arch of the foot, making them more flexible. Modern tap shoes have soles with heels of varying height (one inch or more) and are commonly made of wood or stacked leather. Some beginner tap shoes have heels made of plastic. The toe box of the tap shoe is located on the front of the shoe for the purpose of reinforcing the shoe; however there are tap shoes that use a soft leather instead. A single tap shoe has two taps: one under the heel, and another under the toes.

Popular tap shoe makers include Bloch and Capezio.

=== Styles ===
There are several styles of tap shoes:

- Mary Jane
- Character Heel
- Oxford

=== Taps ===
Depending on manufacturer and model, tap characteristics can vary considerably. For example, some taps have relatively low weight and small footprint whereas others may be thicker and fill out the edge of the shoe more, making them heavier as a result. A tap's "tone" is influenced by its weight as well as its surface shape, which may be concave or convex. The tonal quality of a tap can also be influenced by the material it is made from, and the presence of a soundboard.

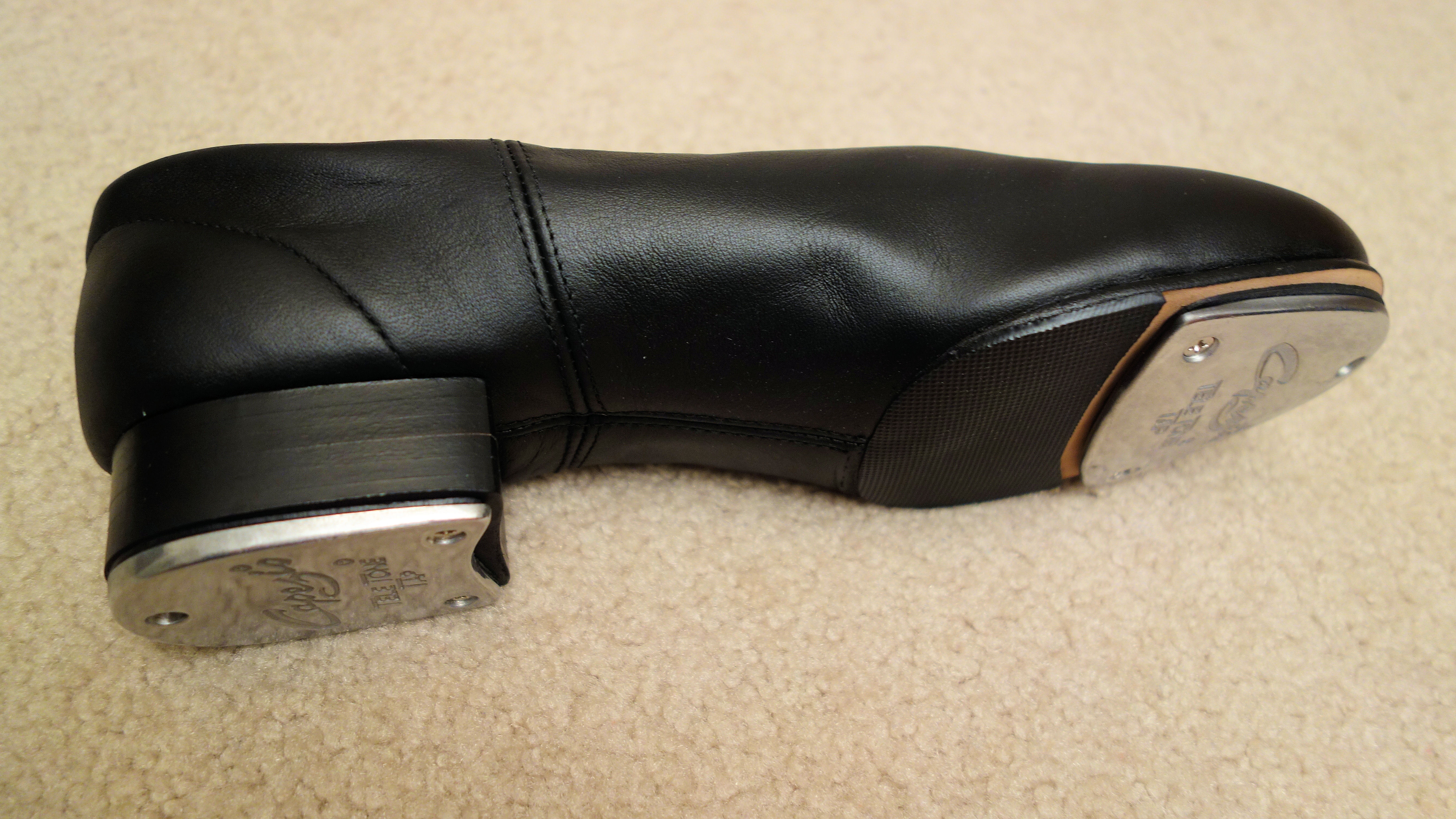
Side view of tap shoe, showing taps mounted to bottoms of heel and toe

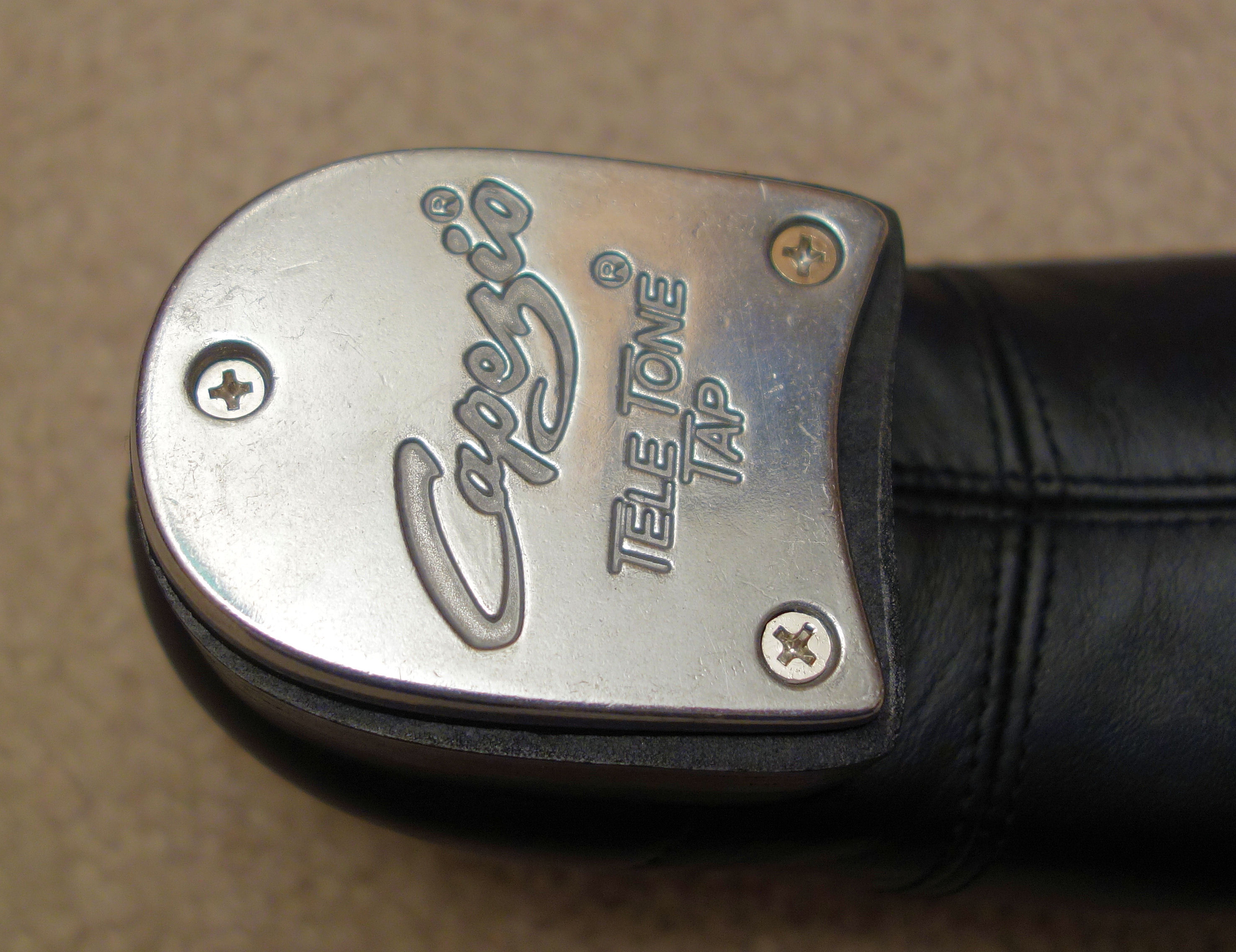
Metal tap on bottom of heel

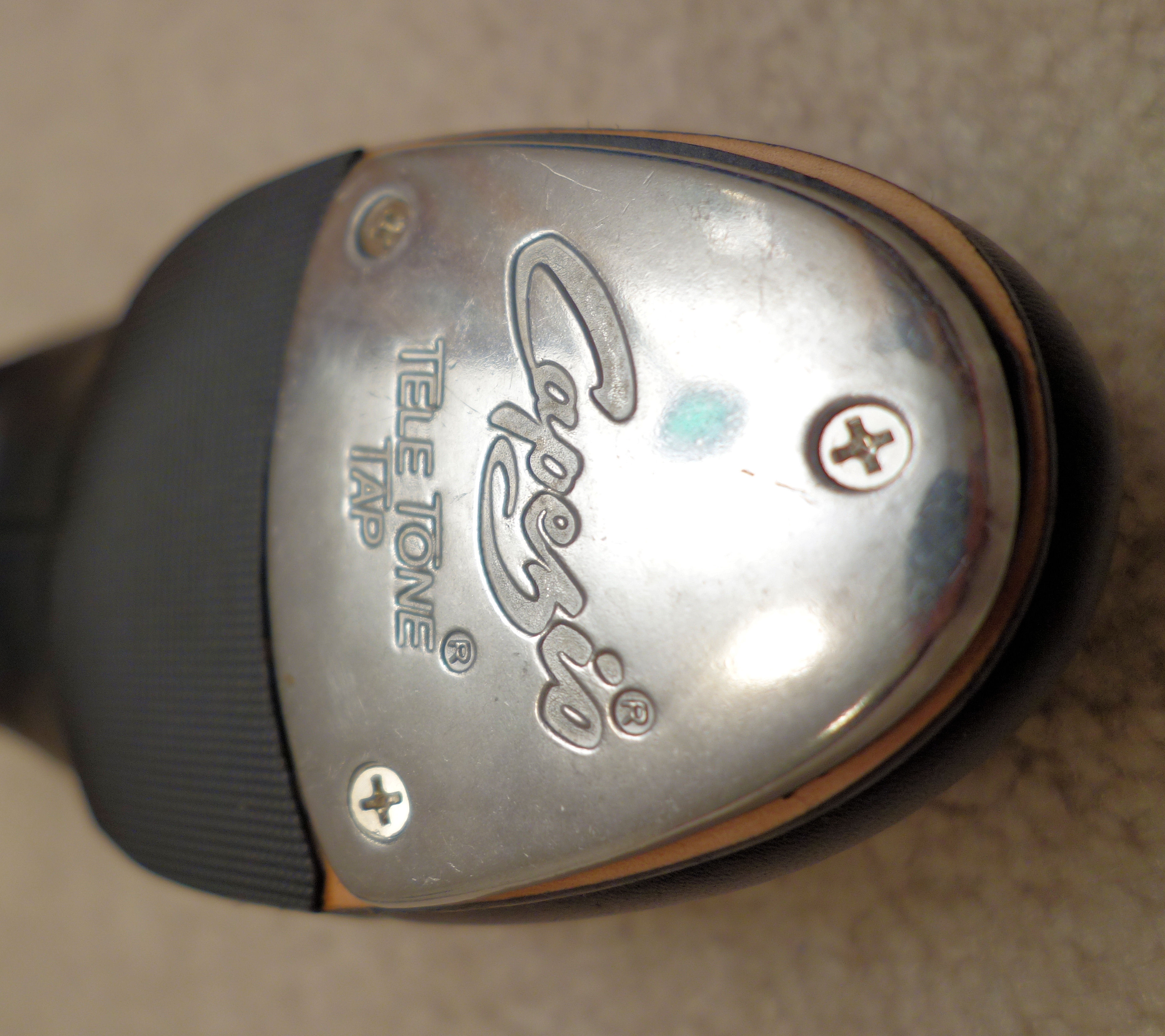
Metal tap on bottom of toe

Taps are mounted to the sole of the shoe with screws, and sometimes adhesive as well. The screws are driven into a soundboard – a thin fiberboard integrated into the sole that can be firmly "gripped" by the screws – to reliably attach the tap to the shoe. When no adhesive is used, the screws can be loosened or tightened to produce different sounds, whereas tonal quality is fixed when adhesive is used.

== See also ==
- Step dance
- Stepping (African-American)
- Flamenco
- Irish dance
- List of shoe styles
