= Tony Langston =

American film critic

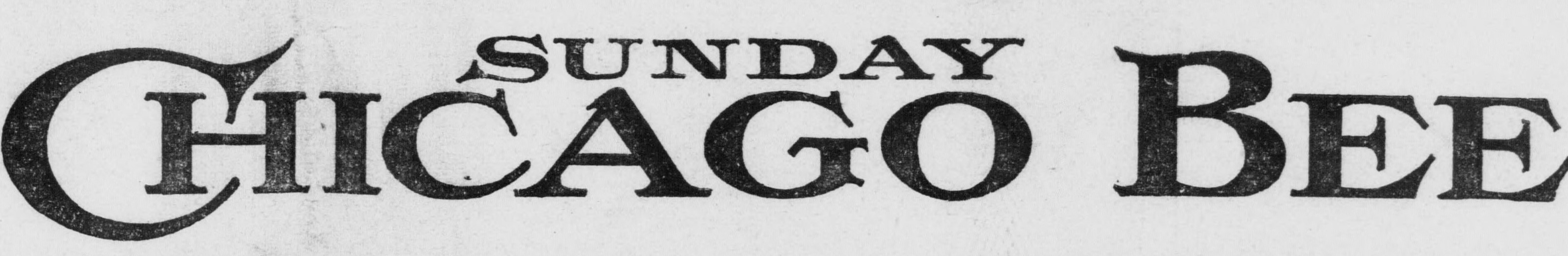
- Born: Detroit
- Occupations: Entertainment writer and critic
- Era: Late teens to mid-1920s
- Employer(s): The Chicago Defender and the Chicago Bee
- Known for: Reviews of Black film, music and theater

Tony Langston was best known as "a tastemaker," an unusually insightful and persuasive African American arts critic who could tip "his readers off to a new wave of emerging Black talent" while also effectively arguing against racist tropes. As entertainment editor for the Chicago Defender, the city's largest Black newspaper, Langston wrote on theater, film and music, reviewing everything from the rare talent of Bessie Smith to the outrageous racism of Birth of a Nation for as many as a million weekly readers.

Writing largely from the late teens to the mid-1920s, Langston's work was wide-ranging, and inherently political when, for example, he expressed disgust with Ebony Film Corporation's debased depictions of African Americans and encouraged Chicago theater owners to ban the company's films. In a 1920 Competitor magazine article, he joined the conversation about propriety, discussing both film codes and censorship boards, while also corresponding with George Johnson of the Lincoln Film Company. In 1921, fellow culture writer WiIliam Henry Harrison Jr. said, “Tony Langston is without question the most popular Colored theatrical writer not only in America but throughout the world ... [and the] highest paid writer in the history of Colored journalism.”

== Career ==
After leaving the Chicago Defender alongside several other writers amid false accusations of embezzlement, Langston spent a year or so at the Chicago Bee, only to leave his post there in 1926, to head the sales team at "Baby Calculator." Langston, also a former actor, went on to become part owner of several theaters, and run his own agency, the Langston Slide and Advertising Co., in Chicago's thriving Black neighborhood of Bronzeville.

The Detroit-born critic came of age during the silent Black film-making period, and like fellow critic Lester Walton transitioned into writing about "talkies."

== See also ==
- Sylvester Russell of The Freeman
- D. Ireland Thomas.
- Lester Walton of The New York Age
