= Buster Brown (tap dancer) =

American tap dancer (1913–2002)

James "Buster" Brown (1913–2002) was an American tap dancer active from the 1930's to 2000. Brown started his career in African-American dance circuits while still in high school and went on to perform internationally, accompanying acts like Duke Ellington and dancing with Savion Glover. Having appeared in numerous films and documentaries, including Francis Ford Coppola's The Cotton Club, he has been described as an inventor of the tap dance art form and one of the most prominent figures in the world of tap dance.

== 1913-1930s: Early life ==
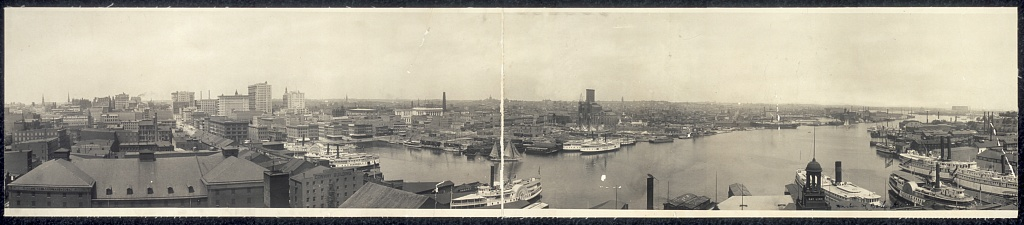
Baltimore in the early 1900s

Brown was born James Richard Brown in 1913 in Baltimore, Maryland. He was the only boy, with seven sisters. His father William Brown, an oyster shucker, died when he was six years old, leaving his mother to raise the children. Brown acquired the nickname "Buster" as a child. The children all took jobs after school to support the family. The entire family loved to dance, and Buster picked up tap by imitating people on the street. "I started to dance when I started to walk," he said later.

While still a child, Brown watched six year old Albert "Pops" Whitman, son of Alice Whitman of the Whitman Sisters, in a tap dance act. This sparked an interest in show business, and Brown started up a male dancing trio with John Orange and Clifton Payne called The Three Little Dots. In high school, he created an act called The Brown Brothers, which later became the Three Aces, with John Orange and Sam Campbell. Brown graduated Frederick Douglas High School in 1933.

== 1930s-40s: The Speed Kings ==
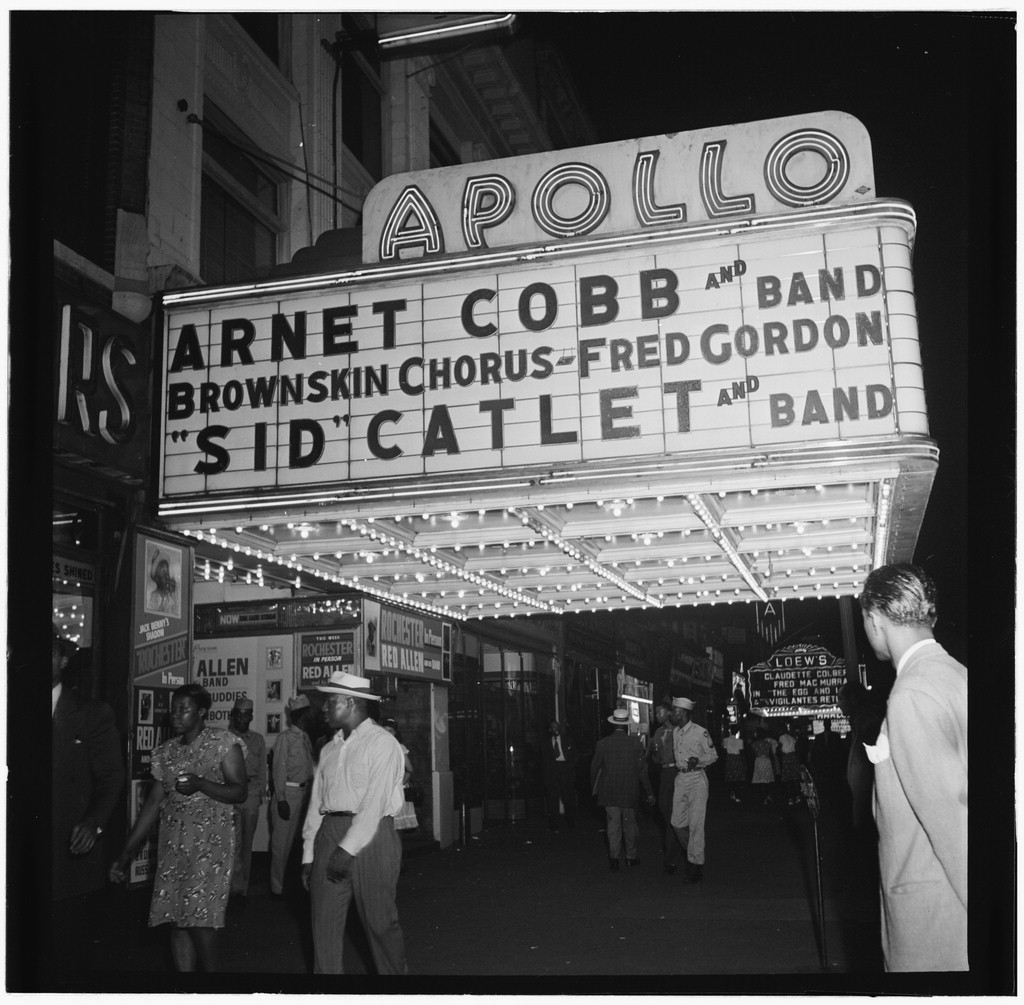
View of the Apollo Theatre marquee, New York, N.Y., between 1946 and 1948. The Speed Kings performed at the Apollo in the 1930s and 40s

After graduation, the performers renamed their act The Speed Kings, The act was a mix of tap, acrobatics and jive that featured speed and precision dancing. They performed a two week tour in a variety show in Washington DC, then worked with Brownskin Models at the Apollo Theater. When John Orange died suddenly in a swimming accident, Brown went to Cleveland Ohio, where he created Speed Kings 2 with Emmet McClure and Sylvester Lake. The act opened with soft-shoe dancing, then moved into a rhythmic precision dance.

In the 1930s, the Speed Kings 2 went to Broadway on the T.O.B.A circuit. In 1939, they played the Apollo Theater and Small's Paradise with Earl Bostic's band. When he wasn't working, Brown frequented the Hoofer's Club. The Speed Kings 2 continued performing through World War II, and participated in the Cole Porter musical film, "Something to Shout About." (1943). The group disbanded in 1942.

== 1940s-50s: Post-war years ==
After working briefly with a singing group called The Three Riffs, Brown formed a solo comedy and tap act in New York. In 1945, he paired up with Ernest "Pippy" Cathy to form the duo Brown and Beige. In the early 50s, the duo broke up, and Brown worked with a comedy singing and dancing group called the Choclateers.

With the death of celebrity tap dancer Bill "Bojangles" Robinson in 1949, the popularity of tap dancing declined and jobs became hard to come by. During this time, Brown worked for a record company, clerked in a hotel, cleaned buildings and managed a restaurant.

== 1960s-1970s: International acclaim ==
In the 1960s, Brown started dancing again, with a group founded by Leticia Jay called the Hoofers, which did tap jams once a week on 125th street in Harlem. He also appeared in a television show produced by Jay. In 1966, Brown toured in a solo act throughout the U.S. and Canada with the Duke Ellington Big Band, and also performed in Berlin, Germany. In 1967, he moved with his wife and family to an apartment in Manhattan and began singing that same year with the Ink Spots. In 1968, the Hoofers traveled to Africa on a State Department sponsored Jazz Dance Theater tour, where they performed for Emperor Haile Selassie. In the 1970s, he became a lifetime member of the tap dancing The Copasetics Club, founded in 1949, in memory of Bill Robinson. In 1974, Brown appeared in the tap dance documentary, Great Feats of Feet."

== 1980s-2000s: Tap dance renaissaance ==
In the 1980s, tap dance was undergoing a renaissance, which helped Brown's career. He worked with the Broadway touring production of Bubblin' Brown Sugar and the Paris musical Black and Blue, as well as continuing to perform with the Hoofers, the Copasetics, and in solo shows, He also taught at festivals and workshops throughout America. His film and television credits included the television show Tap Dancing, the Francis Ford Coppola film "The Cotton Club" (1984) a video documentary, Cookie's Scrapbook. (1987) a PBS television show “Gershwin Gala” and a tap special, “Dance in America”.

Tap dancer and choreographer Savion Glover paid tribute to Brown in his 1995 Broadway musical Bring in ‘da Noise, Bring in ‘da Funk, with a solo in which he imitated Brown's 'fast and light' style. Brown also performed with Glover in “Foot Notes – the Concert” at the Wilshire Theatre in Los Angeles in 2000.

In a review of that performance, The Los Angeles Times wrote “dancing to ‘April in Paris,’ octogenarian James ‘Buster’ Brown exemplifies the sharpness and physical/spatial economy of classic Copasetics Club style: nothing wasted, except maybe some of the jokes between numbers.”

In the late 1990s, mentoring the next generation of tap dancers, Brown hosted Sunday evening tap dance jam sessions at Swing 46 in New York City. In an interview at age 86, Brown said "I'm still in love with tap dancing," even though he couldn't do all the moves he used to.

In 2002, Oklahoma City University awarded him an honorary Doctorate of Performing Arts.

== Death and legacy ==
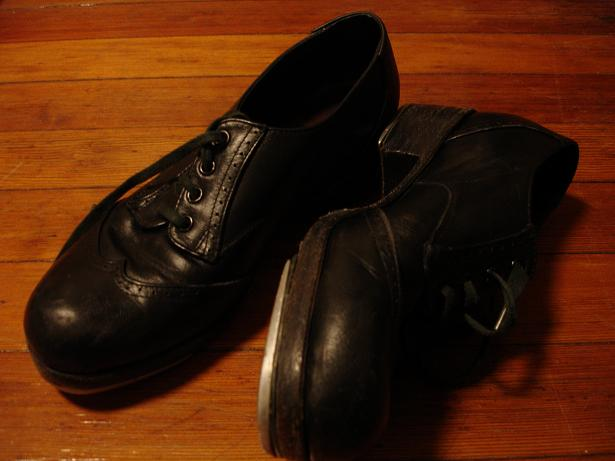
Tapshoes

Brown died in New York City in May, 2002. In his memory, tap dancer Charles Goddertz said, "I would award Buster Brown the Nobel Prize for performance, dance, and the enrichment of audiences. He is a role model and humanist to the highest degree." Brown was also remembered for his scat renditions of songs "Fascinating Rhythm," and "Just You."

In her book Dance Appreciation, Dawn Davis Loring described Brown as a rhythm tap dancer, and a hoofer who also 'performed soft-shoe routines with elegance and strength' He has been cited as 'one of the most prominent figures in the world of tap dance'and 'an inventor of the art form' as well as an influence on later entertainers like Sammy Davis Jr., and Gregory Hines.

== See also ==
- List of dancers
