= George Graves =

George Graves may refer to:

- George Graves (actor) (1876–1949), English comic actor
- George Graves (biologist) (1784–1839), British naturalist's pocket-book author
- George S. Graves (1820–1902), American lawyer, businessman, and politician

== See also ==
- Nadine George-Graves, American professor of theater and dance
