= Black Vaudeville =

Vaudeville-era African American entertainment

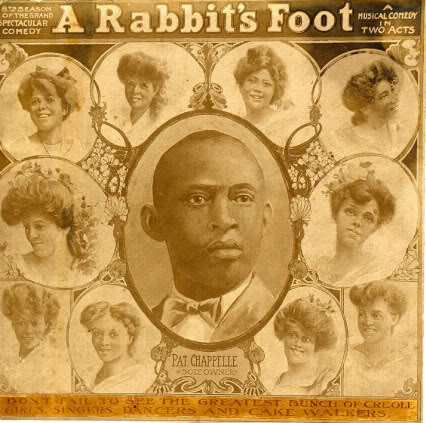
Cover of A Rabbit's Foot theatre program, about 1908, featuring promoter Pat Chappelle

Black Vaudeville is a term that specifically describes Vaudeville-era African American entertainers and the milieus of dance, music, and theatrical performances they created. Spanning the years between the 1880s and early 1930s, these acts not only brought elements and influences unique to American black culture directly to African Americans but ultimately spread them beyond to both white American society and Europe.

Vaudeville had what were known as "circuits", venues that booked touring entertainers. Racism made it difficult for a black performer to be accepted into the white circuits of the day, though some performers had crossover appeal. The Theater Owners Booking Association (TOBA) was created for Black performers to get steady bookings in theaters that served Black audiences. Eventually, TOBA was replaced in the 1930s by "chitlin' circuits", which emerged to link black performers and entertainment opportunities.

== Background ==
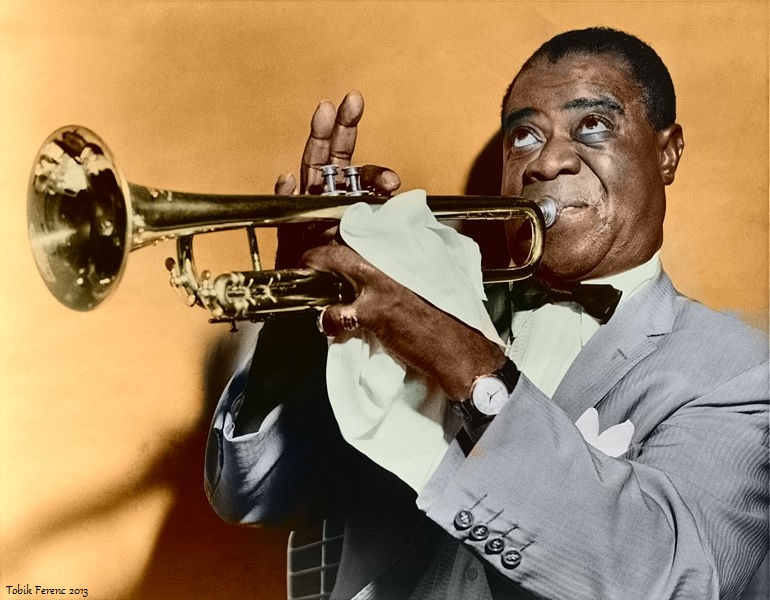
Louis Armstrong was one of the many jazz greats who got their start in Vaudeville

American Vaudeville began in the early 1880s, at the end of Reconstruction, and ended with the rise of talking cinema and the Great Depression in the early 1930s. Vaudeville's popularity first started in Northeastern states, then quickly spreading West until there was a centralized American Vaudeville circuit in the 1890s. Each Vaudeville show contained a number of different acts, which might feature singing, juggling, acrobatics, dancing, comedy, and novelty acts. With its roots in variety and Minstrel Shows of the mid-19th century, it was common in Vaudeville for white performers to perform racist stereotypes of Black Americans, using Blackface, minstrel songs, and coon songs, in their acts.

Talented Black Americans saw working in Vaudeville as a more profitable and satisfying alternative than the laboring and domestic jobs that were available to them in the 19th century (See: Chattel Slavery). The salary for Vaudeville performances were mainly based on the popularity of the performer but ranged from ~$36 for a single act to ~$200 for a well-known weekly acrobatic performance. Though some early Black performers worked within the stereotypes, using Blackface and writing coon songs themselves, others challenged these stereotypes with irony and humor, or performed and produced acts that were more authentic to their talents and experience. Playing to both white and black audiences, as well as 'mixed' audiences with segregated seating, they were paid less than their white counterparts by national booking agencies and encountered discrimination in lodging and booking. Even though these theatres were mixed, this did not mean Black audience members got the same treatment as White counterparts, black theatergoers would be forced to sit in the back of the theater, in disheveled seats. Shows for white audiences were limited to just one Black act per show out of around 20 performances, though a white actors strike in 1901 opened doors for African American performers. In order to bring less attention to Black performances, African American acts were usually given one of the first or last acts, as theatre managers knew those were the least busy times of the night. Some Black performers opted to work only for Black audiences; others formed their own touring companies, labor organizations, booking agencies and theater circuits.

== Pat Chappelle: early pioneer ==
Before 1912, when Sherman H. Dudley put together the Colored Consolidated Vaudeville Exchange, Vaudeville's major circuits usually included only the managers of theaters serving white audiences. But early Black entrepreneurs like Pat Chappelle organized travelling shows and smaller circuits for black and white audiences and helped pave the way for African American performers.

Chappelle (1869–1911) was a black showman from Jacksonville, Florida. He learned the show business ropes from his uncle Julius C. Chappelle, who allowed him to meet Franklin Keith and Edward F. Albee, producers of Vaudeville. Pat ended up working for Keith and Albee as a piano player. During his Vaudeville debut, he met Edward Elder Cooper who was a journalist interested in black entertainment and the first to write a journal about the African American race in 1891.

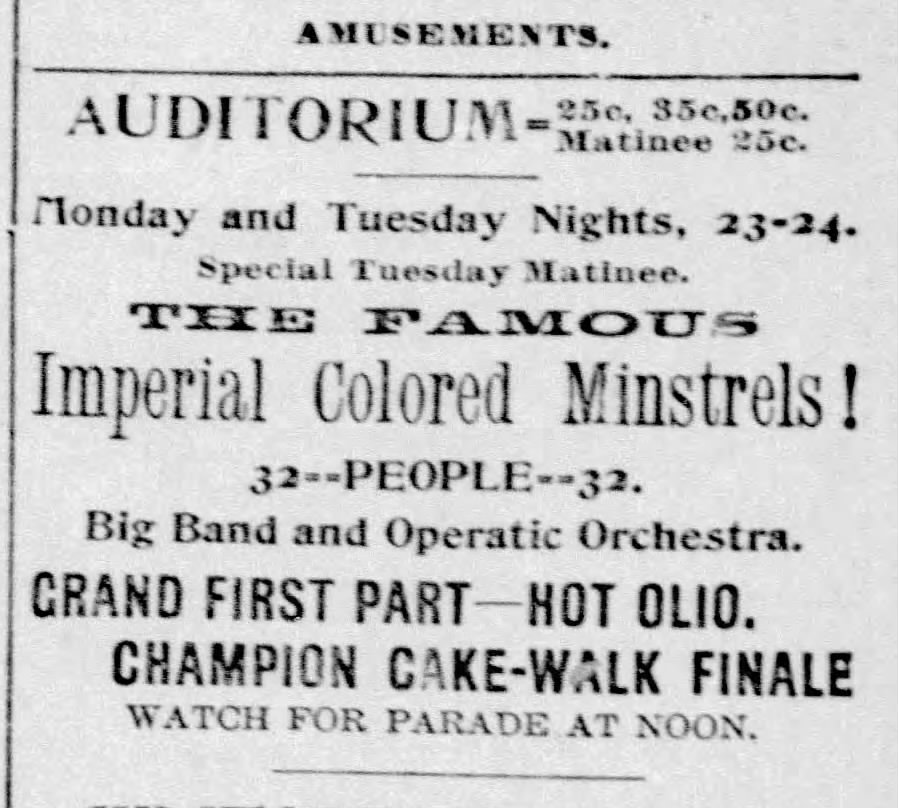
Pat Chapelle's Imperial Colored Minstrels Ad, 1899, Memphis Tennessee. Vaudeville had its roots in Minstrel Shows; Pat Chapelle toured the South with his show and paved the way for Black performers and entrepreneurs in Vaudeville

In 1898, Chappelle organized his first traveling show, the Imperial Colored Minstrels (or Famous Imperial Minstrels), which featured comedian Arthur "Happy" Howe and toured successfully around the South. Chappelle also opened a pool hall in the commercial district of Jacksonville. Remodeled as the Excelsior Hall, it became the first black-owned theater in the South, reportedly seating 500 people.

In 1899, following a dispute with the white landlord of the Excelsior Hall, J. E. T. Bowden, who was also the Mayor of Jacksonville, Chappelle closed the theatre and moved to Tampa, where he – with fellow African-American entrepreneur R. S. Donaldson – opened a new Vaudeville house, the Buckingham, in the Fort Brooke neighborhood. The Buckingham Theatre opened in September 1899, and within a few months was reported to be "crowded to the doors every night with Cubans, Spaniards, Negroes and White people". In December 1899 Chappelle and Donaldson opened a second theatre, the Mascotte, closer to the center of Tampa. A different reporter said, “These theaters have proven themselves to be miniature gold mines.”

His next project was a touring show called A Rabbit's Foot. The difference between this tour and previous ones was, the cast was sixty people, and all performers would be comfortable. If a black performer was able to tour in a white circuit, they would not be allowed to sleep in the hotels when they stopped to rest, because the hotels would not allow it. They slept on the bus because it was better than the floor. On Chappelle's tour, The Freeman described their travel accommodations as “their own train of new dining and sleeping cars, which ‘tis said, when finished, will be a ‘palace on wheels.” Like his Famous Imperial Minstrel show, A Rabbit's Foot contained minstrel and a variety of acts while maintaining the expected Vaudeville staging flare. Chappelle offered a show for everyone.

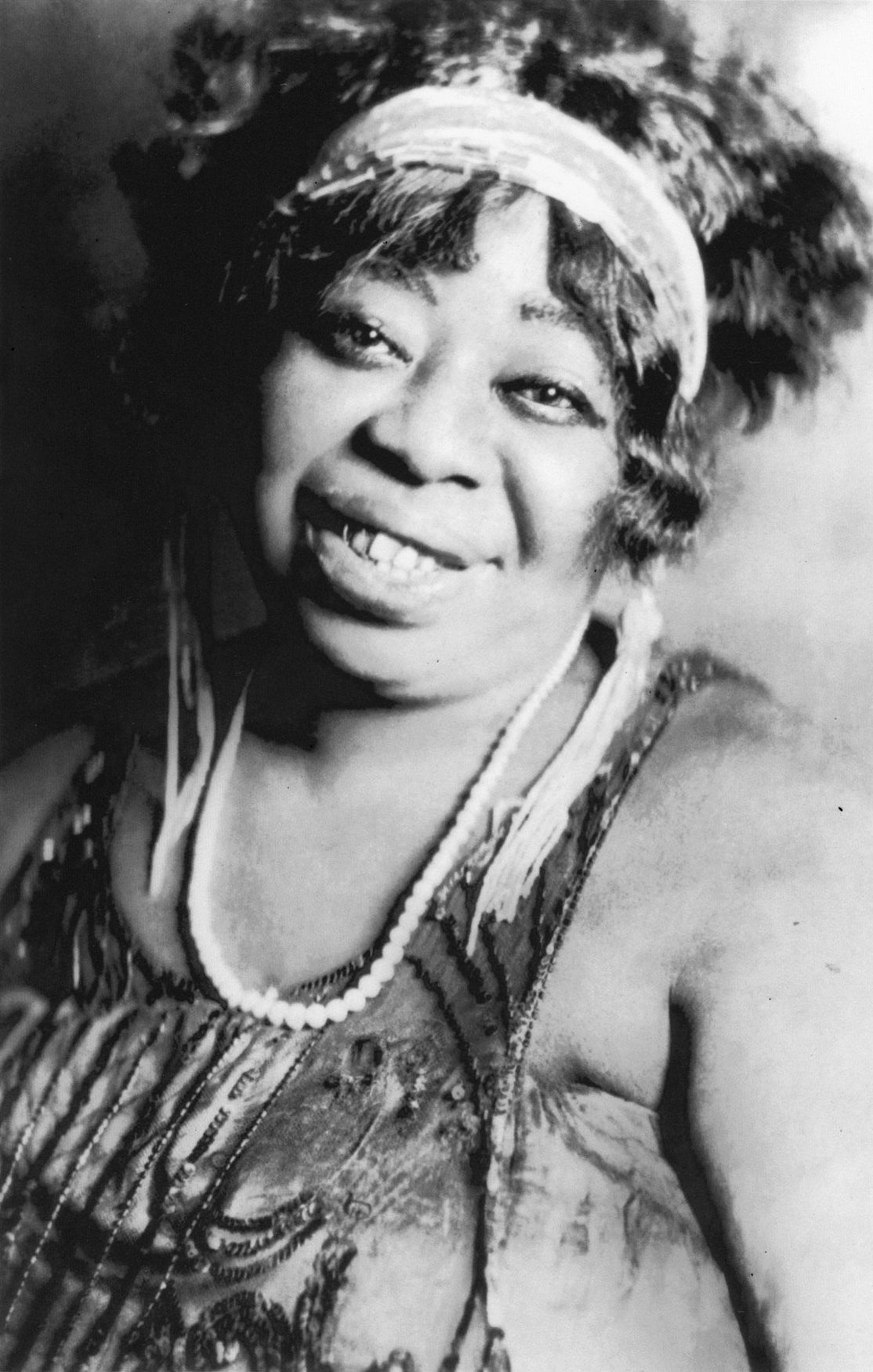
Blues singer Ma Rainey got her start with Pat Chapelle's Company, A Rabbit's Foot

In mid-1900, Chappelle decided to put the show into theatres rather than under tents, first in Paterson, New Jersey, and then in Brooklyn, New York. In October 1901, the company launched its second season, with a roster of performers again led by comedian Arthur "Happy" Howe, and toured in Alabama, Mississippi, Georgia and Florida. The show grew in popularity throughout the early years of the century, and played in both theatres and tents. Trading as Chappelle Bros., Pat Chappelle and his brothers, James E. Chappelle and Lewis W. Chappelle, rapidly organized a small Vaudeville circuit, including theatre venues in Savannah, Georgia, as well as Jacksonville and Tampa. By 1902 it was said that the Chappelle Bros. Circuit had full control of the African American Vaudeville business in that part of the country, "able to give from 12 to 14 weeks [of employment] to at least 75 performers and musicians" each season.

Chappelle stated that he had "accomplished what no other Negro has done – he has successfully run a Negro show without the help of a single white man." As his business grew, he was able to own and manage multiple tent shows, and the Rabbit's Foot Company would travel to as many as sixteen states in a season. The show included minstrel performances, dancers, circus acts, comedy, musical ensemble pieces, drama and classic opera, and was known as one of the few "authentic negro" Vaudeville shows around. It traveled most successfully in the southeast and southwest, and also to Manhattan and Coney Island.

By 1904, the Rabbit's Foot show had expanded to fill three Pullman railroad carriages, and advertised as "the leading Negro show in America". For the 1904–05 season, the company included week-long stands in Washington, D.C., and Baltimore, Maryland. Two of its most popular performers were singing comedian Charles "Cuba" Santana and trombonist Amos Gilliard. Another performer, William Rainey, brought his young bride Gertrude (later known as "Ma" Rainey) to join the company in 1906. That year, Chappelle launched a second traveling tent company, the Funny Folks Comedy Company, with performers alternating between the two companies. The business continued to expand, though in August 1908, one of the Pullman Company railroad carriages used by the show burned to the ground in Shelby, North Carolina, while several of the entertainers were asleep. Chappelle quickly ordered a new carriage and eighty-foot round tent so the show could go on the following week.

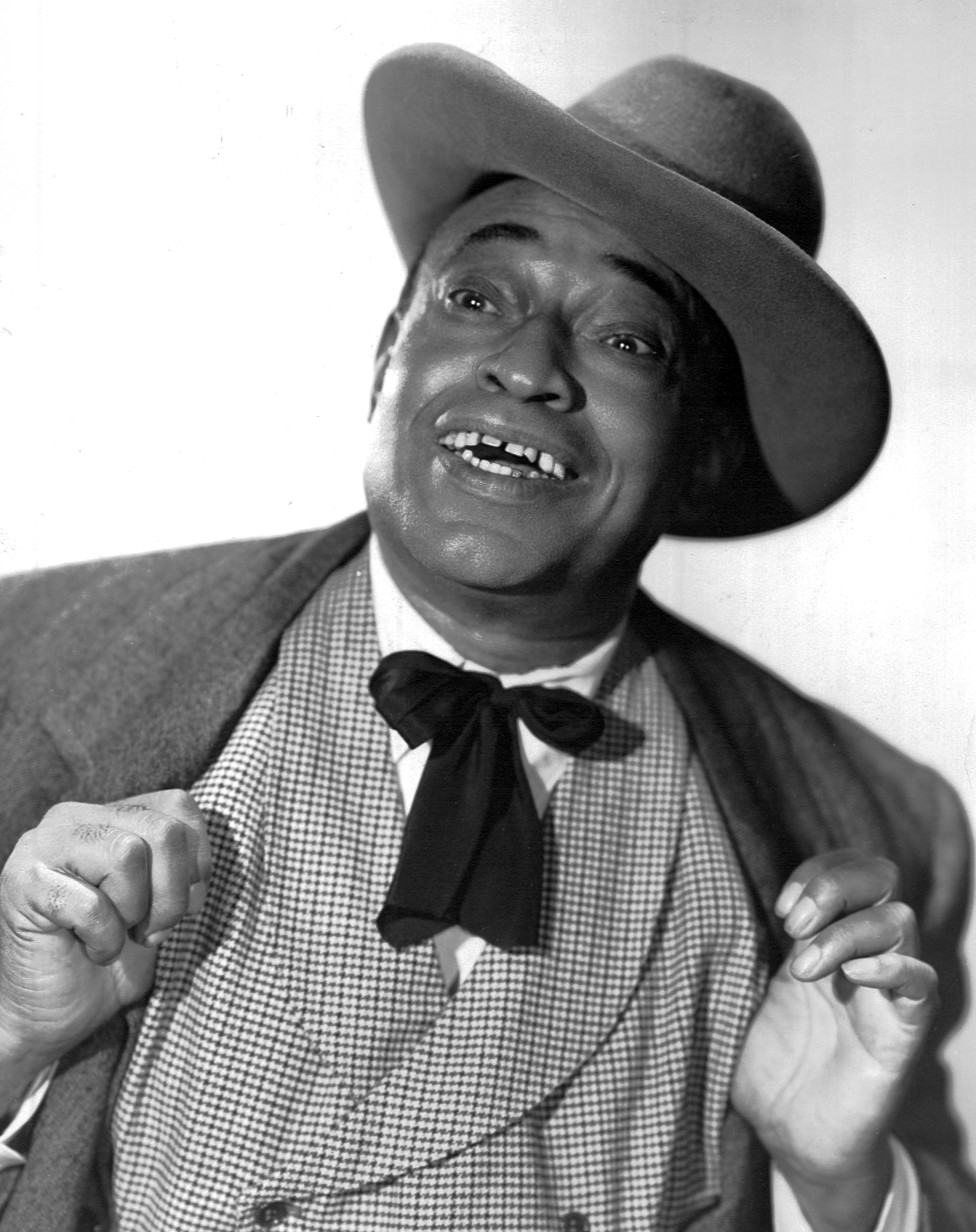
Tim Moore, who became famous as Kingfish in Amos 'n' Andy, worked in Vaudeville

Pat Chappelle died from an unspecified illness in October 1911, aged 42, and the Rabbit's Foot Company was bought in 1912 by Fred Swift Wolcott (1882–1967), a white farmer originally from Michigan, who had owned a small carnival company, F. S. Wolcott Carnivals. Wolcott maintained the Rabbit's Foot company as a touring show, initially as both owner and manager, and attracted new talent including blues singer Ida Cox who joined the company in 1913. "Ma" Rainey also brought the young Bessie Smith into the troupe and worked with her until Smith left in 1915. The show's touring base moved to Wolcott's 1,000-acre Glen Sade Plantation outside Port Gibson, Mississippi in 1918, with offices in the center of town. Wolcott began to refer to the show as a "minstrel show" – a term Chappelle had eschewed – though one member of his company, trombonist Leon "Pee Wee" Whittaker, described him as "a good man" who looked after his performers. Each spring, musicians from around the country assembled in Port Gibson to create a musical, comedy, and variety show to perform under canvas. In his book The Story of the Blues, Paul Oliver wrote:

The 'Foots' traveled in two cars and had an 80' x 110' tent which was raised by the roustabouts and canvassmen, while a brass band would parade in town to advertise the coming of the show...The stage would be of boards on a folding frame and Coleman lanterns – gasoline mantle lamps – acted as footlights. There were no microphones; the weaker voiced singers used a megaphone, but most of the featured women blues singers scorned such aids to volume...

The company, by this time known as "F. S. Wolcott's Original Rabbit's Foot Company" or "F. S. Wolcott’s Original Rabbit's Foot Minstrels", continued to perform its annual tours through the 1920s and 1930s, playing small towns during the week and bigger cities at weekends. The show provided a basis for the careers of many leading African American musicians and entertainers, including Butterbeans and Susie, Tim Moore, Big Joe Williams, Louis Jordan, George Guesnon, Leon "Pee Wee" Whittaker, Brownie McGhee, and Rufus Thomas. Wolcott remained its general manager and owner until he sold the company in 1950, to Earl Hendren of Erwin, Tennessee, who in turn sold it in 1955 to Eddie Moran of Monroe, Louisiana, when it was still trading under Wolcott's name. Records suggest that its last performance was in 1959.

== Sherman H. Dudley ==
Sherman Henrey Dudley (1872–1940) was an influential figure to early 20th century American entertainment. Dudley was born to Margret and Alford Dudley and grew up in Bossier County, Louisiana. Dudley was first introduced to the entertainment industry as a traveling performer for medicine shows, with his initial routine being an advertisement for a "Kickapoo" cure.

By the late 1890s, Dudley became an active member in the Texas entertainment scene by using his comedic talent developed in his medicine show performances to gain traction. Not only was Dudley's showmanship being recognized, but his talent for business managing gave him a distinct edge. In 1895, Dudley joined his first black minstrel show at The People's Theater in Houston Texas. In these minstrel shows, whether the performer was white or black, they were masked in blackface while they performed songs and dances about black slaves. These performances highlighted negative stereotypes about African Americans, depicting them as ignorant, unreliable members of society. Even though minstrel shows were aiding in the degradation of African Americans, most talented black singers, composers, writers and dancers joined for the opportunity at creating a stable income in entertainment.

Through Dudley's success at performing in minstrel shows, he gained traction for his talent at performing and his business-oriented mind. Reviews for his comedic performances were outstanding, with one person saying "without a doubt, S.H. Dudley is one of the best comedians on the stage. His droll wit, his genuine humor and refreshing eccentricities, is exemplified in everything he says or does, and he compels his audience to laugh in ‘self defense’"

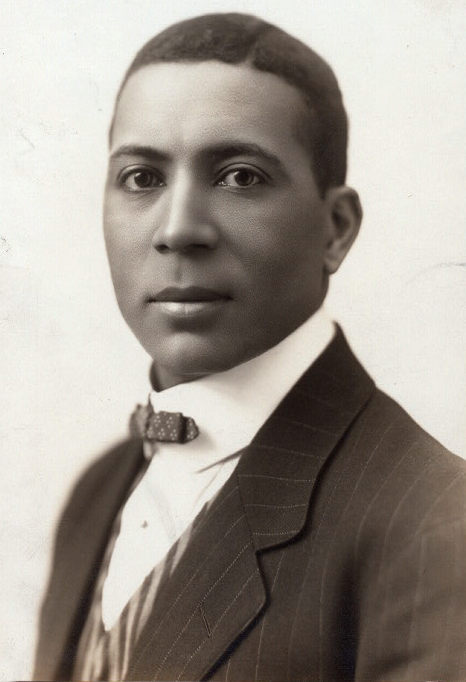
Sherman Dudley started one of the first Black Vaudeville theater circuits

Sherman H. Dudley increased his notoriety between 1903–1912 through his involvement with the entertainment industry, both on and behind the stage. During this time, Dudley started putting forth plans to open up his Black theatre circuit idea. In 1912, Dudley wrote to The Freeman, a newspaper focused on the Black American communities, that he was looking to start up a chain of theatres, for and managed by Black people. Dudley was met with hesitation on his abilities to complete his plan, with The Freeman employee, Sylvester Russel saying:

"Theaters are commercial enterprises and are therefore never totally patronized by either white or colored except in remote parts of the South, where the conditions are different and financially limited.... The only available system I can see at present in a colored theater alliance is as I have expressed it before, that the white man's successful colored theater, in the colored district and the black man's successful theater should link either as a booking alliance or a mixed race syndicate"

Even though reservations were held on Dudley's success, he was able to secure eight theatres across New York, Philadelphia, Baltimore, Washington D.C., Richmond, Newport News, and Norfolk six months after he received critics on his Black theatre circuit plan. These theatres aimed to be nothing like White managed theatres. While White managers placed their emphasis on creating a positive experience for White patrons and left Black customers in worn down balcony seats, Dudley's theatres were meant to empower Black audiences and focus on the comfort and entertainment for them. Dudley's first theatre, The Minnehaha Theatre located on 1213 U Street, was not to the level of extravagance as audience goers anticipated. This venue, renamed the S. H. Dudley Theatre, only had minor renovations to the stage and seats. The S. H. Dudley circuit was fully opened around 1913, after the addition of theatres in Columbus, Delaware and Philadelphia. With this feat he claimed the title of the first African American to operate a profitable Black Theatre circuit.

Soon after this, Dudley announced through The Freeman that he is quitting the performance aspect of Vaudeville in order to focus on the success of his circuit. Dudley continued to be a prominent figure in Vaudeville with his creation and implementation of a Black Theatre circuit. His circuit was adding theatres across the United States up until the 1930's, where he had to sell his theatres due to the onset of the Great Depression. Still, Dudley was a key figure for Black entertainment in America, and his work led to the creation of countless jobs and opportunities for African American performers throughout the 20th century.

== Dance ==
As Vaudeville became more popular, the competition for the "most flashy” act increased. As minstrelsy became less popular other types of performances were created and carried on to the Vaudeville stage. A performer named Benjamin Franklin had an act that was described by his minstrel troupe leader, “waltzes with a pail of water on his head and plays the French horn at the same time.”

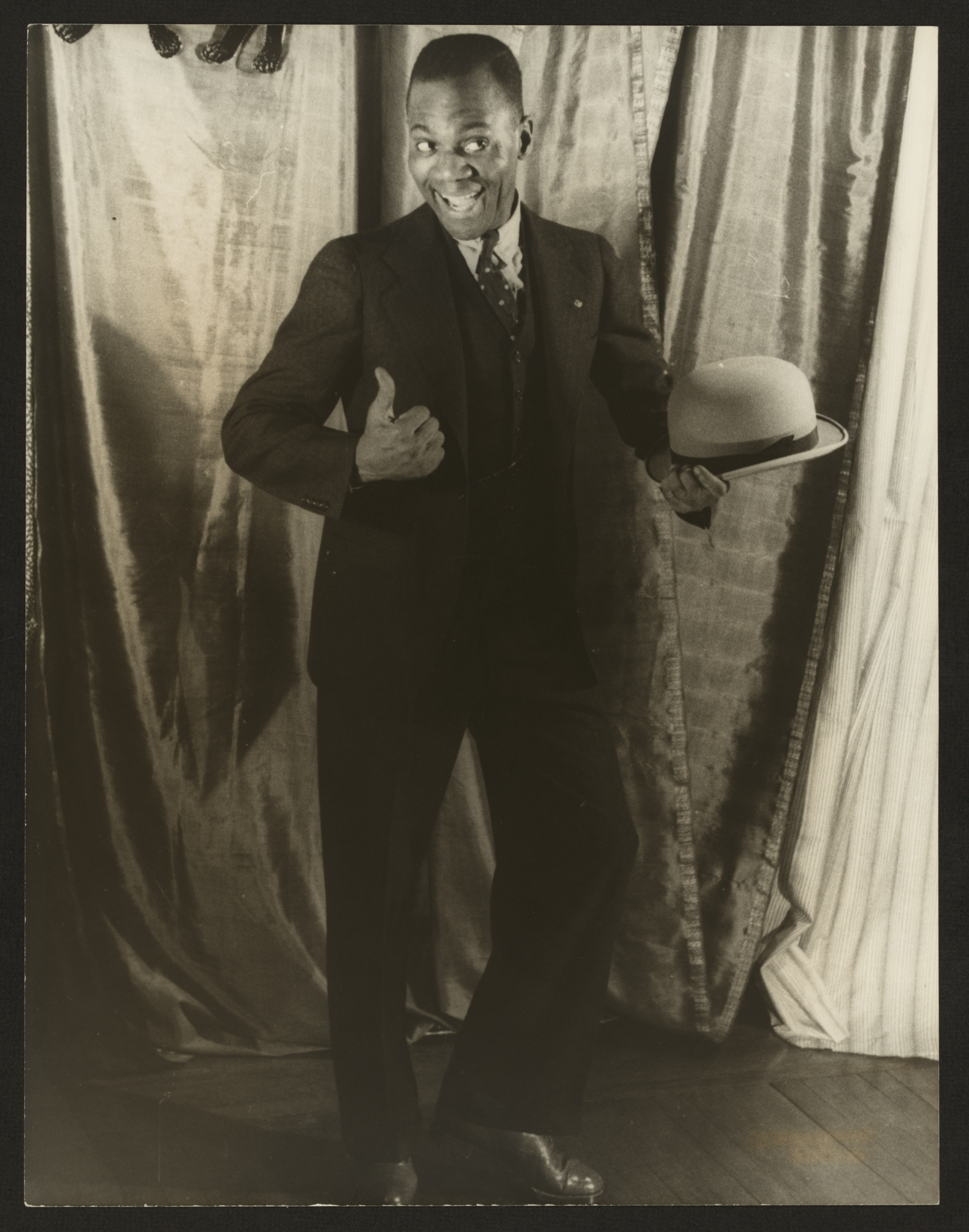
Portrait of tap dancer Bill "Bojangles" Robinson, 1920s

Dance was entertainment that was accepted in almost every act slot on the bill for a Vaudeville show. Tap, with origins in Africa and Europe, was a style that was often seen. A West African dance style called Gioube, a step-style dance, was mixed with Scottish and Irish clog-shoe dances to create tap.

=== Dance variants ===
Vaudeville saw two types of tap: buck-and-wing and four-four time soft shoe. Buck-and-wing consisted of gliding, sliding, and stomping movements at high speeds. Buck-and-wing tap dance style is characterized mostly by the intense jumping, limb flinging, and rhythmic feet shuffling. Wing was a portion in which on a jump, feet would continue to dance in midair. Soft shoe was more relaxed and elegant, usually performed with a softer sole than other forms of tap dance. Metal plates were added to the bottom of tap shoes to create a stronger percussion sound.

=== Famous dancers ===
Famous tap dancers of the time who are still well-remembered today include Buster Brown and the Speed Kings, Beige & Brown, the Nicholas Brothers and Bill "Bojangles" Robinson. Alice Whitman of the Whitman Sisters was highly praised for her skills in both ballet and tap-dancing. Dancer and choreographer Aida Overton Walker was known as the Vaudeville Queen of the Cakewalk.

== Music ==
The black musicians and composers of the Vaudeville era influenced what is now known as American musical comedy, jazz, blues and Broadway musical theater. The popular music of the time was ragtime, a lively form developed from black folk music prominently featuring piano and banjo. The fast tempo of Ragtime matched the pace of the Vaudevillian revue type show.

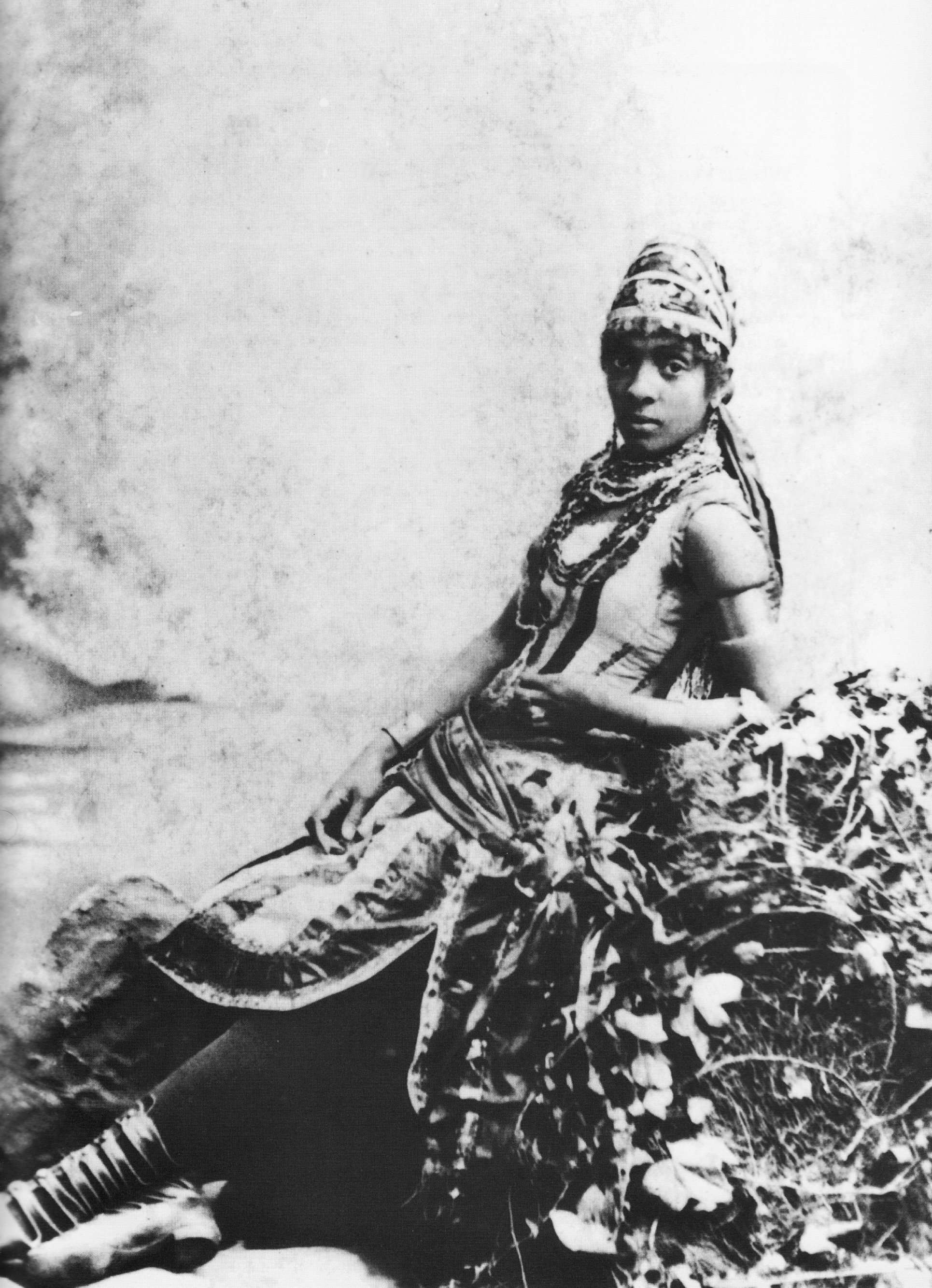
Anna Madah Hyers of the Hyers Sisters, who wrote and performed musical theater

Thomas Greene Bethune (or "Blind Tom") composed 100 pieces and could play over 7,000. He was exploited by a slave owner John Benthune. For example, John let Tom perform to make himself money. “Blind Tom” made $100,000 in 1866 and only received $3,000 of this. John William Boone was a fellow blind pianist, a professional at the age of fourteen, known as “Blind Boone”. John and Tom shared a piano ragtime style of "jig piano". This consisted of the left hand playing the beat of the tuba while the right hand played the fiddle and banjo melodies. This music portrayed slaves dances, including beats at times created by the only instrument they had, their bodies.

Other successful Black composers and songwriters of the Vaudeville era included Ernest Hogan, Bob Cole, Rosamond Johnson, George Johnson, Tom Lemonier, Gussie L. Davis, Chris Smith, Irving Jones, Will H. Dixon, Turner Layton and Henry Creamer.

The Hyers Sisters, who began performing in the late 1870s, and Sissieretta Jones, who gave up classic opera to lead a Vaudeville touring company, were pioneers of Black Musical Theater. The jazz pianist and composer Eubie Blake got his start in 1920s Vaudeville, as did Louis Armstrong and other jazz musicians. Notable Black female blues singers who started on the Vaudeville stage included Ma Rainey, Bessie Smith, Clara Smith, Mamie Smith, Mamie Brown, Ida Cox, and Edmonia Henderson. Another venue for up-and-coming musicians and performers was the circus sideshow.

== Comedy ==
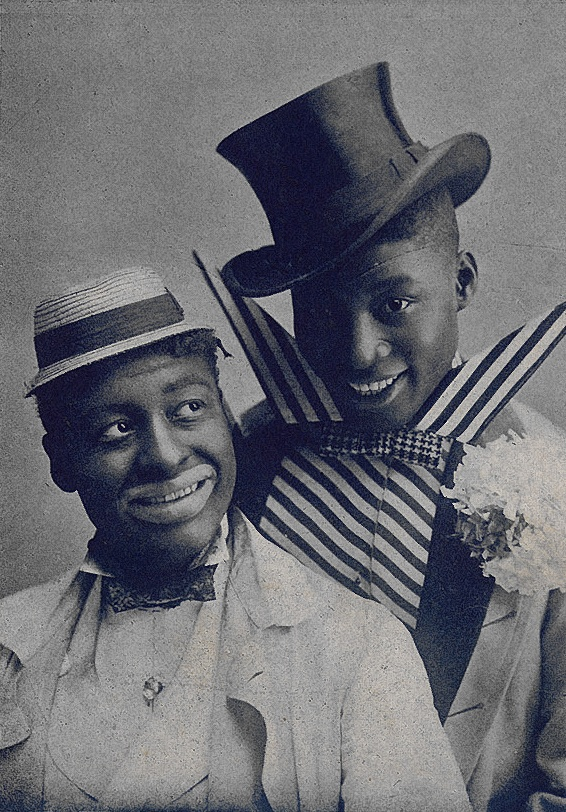
Williams (left) & Walker, on the 1903 cover to the sheet music for "I'm a Jonah Man" (from the musical In Dahomey)

Comedy was one of the mainstays of Vaudeville, singing and dancing acts often incorporated comedy in their routine. Black comedians responded to the prevailing comic Blackface stereotypes by exaggerating them to the point of absurdity, or adding their own, more nuanced authenticity and style. Popular Black comics in Vaudeville included Bert Williams, George Walker, Bob Cole, Ernest Hogan, Billy Kersands, Irving Jones, Charlie Case, Ernie Sunshine Morrison, and the duo Flourney Miller and Aubrey Lyles. Women comedians usually performed as the foil for a male partner; Moms Mabley was the first to create her own solo act in the 1920s, eventually taking it from the Chitlin Circuit to the mainstream. Performers Florence Hines and Andrew Tribble used cross-dressing in their comedy routines.

In 1903, the comedic theatrical company The Smart Set, with performer Ernest Hogan and writer/performer Billy McClain, broke with earlier minstrel stereotypes and presented African Americans as more fashionable and sophisticated, touring throughout the North and South. Though they received good reviews, some Southern white theater owners refused to book them because they did not adhere to common stereotypes. Sherman H. Dudley later took over as producer and lead comedian of this company, followed by Salem Tutt Whitney, who created the Southern Smart Set in the 1910s. Producer Alexander Tolliver also used the name Smart Set in his freewheeling Big Tent variety show, which drew heavily upon developing blues and jazz tunes, and included novelty acts and acrobats. Tolliver's show, with an all black crew, started in 1914 and continued to be popular to black and white audiences until 1930.

== T.O.B.A and Chitlin' circuits ==
As the live entertainment industry grew, actors, singers, comedians, musicians, dancers, and acrobats began to retain agents to book their acts. Booking associations sprung up, serving a middle man role between agents and theater owners. Theaters like the Pekin Theater in Chicago and the Lafayette Theater in New York City were created and managed by Black entrepreneurs for black performers and audiences. The dominant black Vaudeville theater circuit of the day was the Theater Owners Booking Association (TOBA), known among performers of the time as “Tough On Black Actors”. TOBA's management was interracial; Black entrepreneur Sherman H. Dudley laid the groundwork for TOBA in 1912 with his circuit of Black owned theaters, continued managing his part of the TOBA theater circuit and had a position on TOBA's board of directors.

T.O.B.A dissolved in 1930; by then "chitlin' circuits" for black entertainers had begun. The name stemmed from a regional Southern dish associated with blacks and their slave heritage:“chitlins”, deep fried pig's knuckles and intestines. Chitlin' circuit touring groups would often be forced to perform in venues such as school auditoriums because theaters were not always available to them due to segregation. ” They would also travel directly to black neighborhoods to bring them entertainment. The content of the touring shows was melodramatic and farcical, designed to be enjoyed in the moment.

== Notable people in Black Vaudeville ==
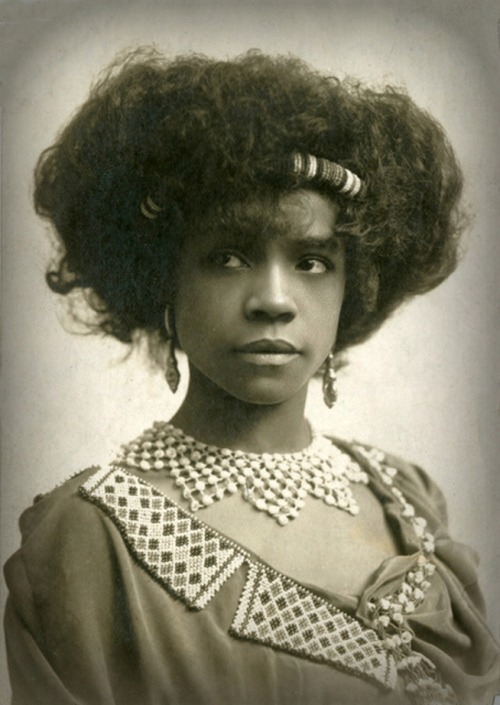
Dancer and choreographer Aida Overton Walker, known as "the Queen of the Cakewalk" 1910

- Sherman H. Dudley (1872–1940), performer and entrepreneur who created the first Black owned Vaudeville circuit and the Colored Actors Union
- The Griffin Sisters (1870s–1918), performers and entrepreneurs who created one of the first Black women-owned Vaudeville circuits
- Florence Hines, (1868–1924) singer/dancer known as "the queen of male impersonators"
- The Hyers Sisters (1857–1901), first Black women Vaudeville performers in 1876, toured U.S. with comic operas addressing slavery and freedom
- John William Isham (1866–1902), creator of The Octoroons, one of the first Vaudeville shows with all Black performers and chorus line
- Moms Mabley (1897–1975), 20th century comedian who got her start in Vaudeville
- Sisserietta Jones (1868–1932), world-renowned opera singer who performed with Black Patti's Troubadours.
- P.G. Lowry (1869–1942), bandleader and entrepreneur who created musical events for circus sideshows
- Sylvester Russell, (1860–1930) theater critic for the Indianapolis Freeman
- Tutt Brothers, writers, producers and performers
- George Walker (1873–1911), comedian and creator of the Frogs, an organization for advancing Black performers and their work
- Whitman Sisters, quartet who ran their own touring company from 1900–1943
- Bert Williams (1874–1922), pre-eminent Vaudeville comedian and actor
- Will H. Dixon (1879-1917), musician, composer and orchestra conductor known as "The Greatest Negro Choral Director"

== See also ==
African-American Musical Theater
