= Alice Whitman =

American tap dancer (1900–1968)

"Baby" Alice Whitman (1900–1968) was an African-American tap dancer and the youngest member of the Whitman Sisters ensemble. Known as the "Queen of Tap", she was considered the troupe's star dancer and was known as the finest woman tap dancer of the 1920s–30s.

== Biography ==
Alice Whitman was born in Atlanta, Georgia, the youngest daughter of Caddie and Reverend Albery Allson Whitman. Alice was significantly younger than her sisters, and according to some accounts, was adopted. Alice's father Reverend Whitman was born into slavery, but at the time of Alice's birth was a prominent black poet and writer. He would become known as the "Poet Laureate of the Negro Race" and served as Bishop of the African Methodist Episcopal Church in Lawrence, Kansas. Alice was born while her father was serving as Dean of Morris Brown College in Atlanta. Reverend Whitman died in 1901, when Alice was only a year old.

=== The Whitman Sisters ===
In 1899, the year before Alice's birth, Whitman's older sisters Mabel (aged 21), Essie (19) and Alberta (14) launched their comedy, dance and vaudeville troupe. In 1905, when "Baby" Alice was aged four, the Whitmans moved their formal base of operation from Atlanta to Chicago, and "Baby" Alice would formally join the act. The Whitman Sisters would remain in Chicago for the rest of their career. In 1908, the act was noted for popularizing the cakewalk, a dance at which Alice would become particularly proficient.

In 1909, when Alice was nine years old, her mother Caddie died. Mabel, the family's oldest daughter, took over raising Alice, as well as managing the group. Over the course of Mabel's leadership of the group, it would become the highest-paid act on the black vaudeville circuit.

=== Baby Alice ===
Not long after joining, "Baby" Alice became the Whitman Sisters star dancer. At a very young age, Alice was noted for her clear tapping, and proficiency in ballet and song. Her opening act began with the Shim Sham Shimmy. Her clear steps were said to win her many cakewalk competitions. Over time she became recognized as one of the first black women to have a successful solo tap act, which was dominated by male dancers at the time. Alice would dance pairs with her sister Alberta, who appeared in male drag as "Bert".

In 1919, Alice married Aaron Palmer, a longtime member of the Whitman troupe. That year, she gave birth to a son, Albert "Little Pops" Whitman. "Pops" would follow in his mother's footsteps on stage and in the Whitman Sister's act, joining the group at age four, as his mother did. He would distinguish himself as an acrobatic tap dancer, executing cartwheels, spins, flips and spins to the music.

The Whitman Sisters act grew to encompass an ensemble of dancers, comedians, and musicians featuring 20 to 30 performers, touring the United States vaudeville circuit until the death of eldest sister Mabel in 1942.

=== Later career and solo acts ===
Despite Alice's reputation, she largely remained with the Whitman Sisters, only performing occasionally outside the group as a solo act. In the 1930s, she made several appearances at New York's Apollo Theater. In 1935, Alice performed in the opening night of Hot Chocolates at Connie's Inn in Harlem. Despite a reportedly stellar performance, she was purportedly fired for being too "light-skinned" to appear in the ensemble.

In 1937, Alice married her second husband, Lester "Lynn" McCowan. After the end of the Whitman Sisters, Alice developed a short-lived touring solo act. Alice would appear onstage until her retirement in 1943.

=== Legacy ===
Alice Whitman McCowan died in Chicago in 1968. Her son Albert developed a tap duo with Louis Williams, "Pops and Louis", which became a successful act, touring in Europe before his untimely death in Athens, Greece, in 1950.

In 2012, Alice and her sisters were inducted into the American Tap Dance Hall of Fame.

== See also ==
- Black Vaudeville
- History of Tap Dance
