= Sylvester Russell =

American arts critic (1860s–1930)

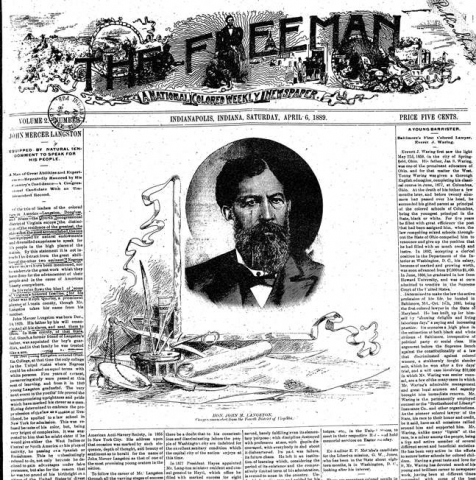
- Front page of The Freeman in 1889.
- Born: 1860s
- Died: October 11, 1930
- Occupations: Entertainment writer and critic
- Employer(s): The Chicago Defender, Indianapolis Freeman

Sylvester Russell (1860s – October 11, 1930) was a performer who became a newspaper columnist. He was the "first Black arts critic to gain national recognition in the U.S.," in his turn-of-the-century column in the Indianapolis Freeman. In a 30-year career that spanned three cities: his early days in Indianapolis, time at the Chicago Defender and, finally, New York City where he founded and published a newspaper called the Star, and famously developed a system of ranking Black performance qualitatively from "low comedy/minstrelsy" at the bottom to the "classics" at the top, which reflected his:

... clear desire to establish African American music as a field worthy of study, with a history and progressive development. His examination of Black music for a Black audience was a direct challenge to a world where white people in blackface had been allowed to define the musical and performance qualities of what it meant to be Black.

That kind of specificity begot nuanced discussions on the page about the transition from vaudeville to silent film, which led to him and fellow music critic Nora Douglas Holt attaining the status of pioneers. Later in his career, Russell became known for a dispute with Bill "Bojangles" Robinson as efforts to establish an association to build a memorial home for "Race actors" in honor of Florence Mills progressed.

He challenged segregation laws by sitting at a table in an upscale restaurant.

== See also ==
- Tony Langston
- Ireland Thomas
- Lester Walton
