= Albery Allson Whitman =

American writer

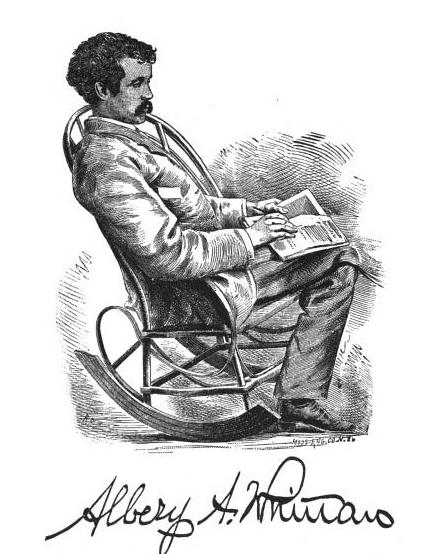
Front piece and signature from the 1884 publication of The Rape of Florida

Albery Allson Whitman (May 30, 1851 – June 29, 1901) was an African-American poet, minister and orator. Born into slavery, Whitman became a writer. During his lifetime he was acclaimed as the "Poet Laureate of the Negro Race". He worked as a manual laborer, school teacher, financial agent, fundraiser and pastor. He died in Atlanta in 1901 of pneumonia.

== Early life and education ==
Whitman was born into slavery at a farm near Munfordville, Kentucky. After years as a manual laborer, working at a plowshop, on railroad construction and as a teacher, Whitman attended Wilberforce University in 1870. There he studied with Bishop Daniel Payne. Whitman stated that he wrote his 1877 poem "Not a Man and Yet a Man" so that "he might speak more effectively for Wilberforce". His writings made him the most popular African American poet in the Reconstruction era.

== Later life and family ==
After six months at Wilberforce, Whitman left to become the financial agent for the university and an African Methodist Episcopal Church pastor in Springfield, Ohio. He later took other pastoral positions between 1879 and 1883, leading and establishing churches in Ohio, Georgia, Kansas, and Texas. He died in 1901 of pneumonia.

Whitman had a wife named Caddie and four daughters. The daughters formed the vaudeville troupe The Whitman Sisters, who performed together from 1900 to the 1940s.

== Style and influence ==
Joan Rita Sherman wrote in African-American Poetry of the Nineteenth Century of Whitman's poetry as "attempts at full-blown Romantic poetry", emulating the American and British authors from that tradition. Whitman himself acknowledged the inspiration of Lord Byron, writing of "the loftiness of Byron's well-wrought rhyme" as an influence. Yet Dickson Bruce argues that "Whitman went beyond sentimental ideals in his understanding of literature, and even beyond the ideological directions outlined by [Frederick] Douglass and his colleagues."

In 1901, shortly before his death, Whitman published An Idyl of the South: An Epic Poem in Two Parts. The opening four lines suggest high romantic poetry through a sentimental reflection on the South: "Hail land of the palmetto and the pine,/From Blue Ridge Mountain down to Mexic's sea/Sweet with magnolia and cape jassamine,/And thrilled with song, — thou art the land for me!"

Albery Whitman's poems are not regularly reprinted in modern anthologies of Black poetry. Benjamin Brawley referred to Whitman as "probably the ablest of the race before Dunbar," and a recent scholar echoes this view, asserting that Whitman was "one of the most important African American poets between Phillis Wheatley and Paul Laurence Dunbar and probably the most prolific." Ivy Wilson notes that Whitman employed "multitudinous metrical configurations" and that "he was consumed with the aesthetics of sound. Much of his major volumes read like novels in verse".

== Collections ==
- Not a Man, and Yet A Man (1877)
- The Rape of Florida (1884, later republished as Twasinta's Seminoles)
- An Idyl of the South: An Epic Poem in Two Parts (1901)
