= Ireland Thomas =

American film critic

Damon Ireland Thomas
- Born: August 16, 1875; Houma, Louisiana
- Died: 1955 (aged 79–80)
- Occupations: Entertainment writer and critic
- Era: 1920s
- Employer: The Chicago Defender
- Known for: Reviews of Black film, music and theatre

Damon Ireland Thomas (1875-1955) was an American stage performer, newspaper columnist, and theater manager. An influential film critic, he wrote for The Chicago Defender in 1920s, reviewing Black film and events at African American theaters.

Thomas managed the successful Lincoln Theater in Charleston, South Carolina, which served African American audiences from 1922 until his death in 1955. He also managed the Bijou Theater in Tampa, Florida and another theater in Atlanta, Georgia.
