= Nadine George-Graves =

American professor of theater and dance

Nadine George-Graves is an academic who works at the intersection of African American studies, gender studies, and dance and theater history. She holds the Naomi Willie Pollard Endowed Chair at Northwestern University with appointments in the Department of Performance Studies and Department of Theatre . She is also the executive co-editor of Dance Research Journal. She has a PhD in Theater and Drama from Northwestern University, and a BA in Philosophy and Theater Studies from Yale University.

== Career ==
George-Graves formerly served as a professor of Theater and Dance, vice chair of the Department of Theater and Dance, and Acting Associate Dean for Arts and Humanities at the University of California, San Diego. She was also the previous chair of the Department of Dance and a professor of theatre at The Ohio State University.

George-Graves is also the past president of the Congress on Research in Dance. She also served on the executive boards of the Lincoln Theatre in Columbus, Ohio, American Society for Theater Research, the Society of Dance History Scholars, the editorial boards of SDHS and Choreographic Practices, and is a founding member of the Collegium for African Diasporic Dance (CADD).

== Creative projects ==
Her creative projects include Architectura, a dance theater piece inspired by architecture, about how we build our lives, Suzan-Lori Parks' Fucking A, and Topdog/Underdog.

== Awards ==
She is a recipient of the 2021 Outstanding Scholarly Research in Dance Award from the Dance Studies Association and Dramaturg for Bessie Honoree Brother(hood) Dance! in 2020. In 2016 she received the Diversity Equity Inclusion Distinguished Teaching Award; in 2014 she received the Living Legacy Award from the Women's International Center.

== Works ==
She is the author of a number of books and articles on African American theater and dance.

Books

- The Royalty of Negro Vaudeville: The Whitman Sisters and the Negotiation of Race, Gender and Class in African American Theater 1900–1940, 2003, ISBN 0312225628
- Urban Bush Women: Twenty Years of African American Dance Theater, Community Engagement, and Working It Out, 2012, ISBN 978-0-299-23554-3; 2012 Sally Banes Award honorable mention of the American Society for Theatre Research
- (edited)George-Graves, Nadine, ed. (2015). The Oxford handbook of dance and theater. New York: Oxford University Press. doi:10.1093/oxfordhb/9780199917495.001.0001. ISBN 9780199917495. 2016 Sally Banes Award honorable mention of the American Society for Theatre Research

Chapters

- "'Just Like Being at the Zoo', Primitivity and Ragtime Dance", in: Ballroom, Boogie, Shimmy Sham, Shake: A Social and Popular Dance Reader, 2009, ISBN 025207565X, pp. 55–71
