= Whitman Sisters =

Black Vaudeville quartet

The Whitman Sisters (l-r) Alberta, Alice, Mabel, Essie

"Bert" and Alice Whitman

The Whitman Sisters were four African-American sisters who were stars of Black Vaudeville. They ran their own performing touring company for over forty years from 1900 to 1943, becoming the longest-running and best-paid act on the T.O.B.A. circuit. They comprised Mabel (May) (b. Ohio; 1880–1942), Essie (Essie Barbara Whitman; b. Osceola, Arkansas, July 4, 1882 – May 7, 1963), Alberta "Bert" (b. Kansas; 1887–1964) and Alice (b. Georgia; 1900–December 29, 1968).

== History ==
The sisters were the daughters of Reverend Albery Allson Whitman and Caddie Whitman (née White), who lived in Ohio, Arkansas and Kansas before settling in Atlanta, Georgia. The sisters had an older brother, Caswell (1876–1936). Reverend A. A. Whitman came to be known as the "Poet Laureate of the Negro Race". The sisters were taught by their father to sing religious songs and to dance, in order to accompany him on evangelical tours.

Around 1899, Mabel and Essie began performing as the Danzette Sisters (or "Daznette Sisters" by other sources). They were invited to perform in New York by George Walker but their father and manager insisted that they stay to finish their education, and the sisters continued performing in the south. After their father died in 1901, Mabel, Essie and Alberta formed the Whitman Sisters' Novelty Act Company in Augusta, Georgia, and the twelve-strong Whitman Sisters' New Orleans Troubadours in 1904. The sisters were light-complexioned – their mother may have been white – and were occasionally obliged to perform in blackface. They were described as "bright, pretty mulatto girls" with "wonderful voices". Alberta ("Bert") performed regularly as a male impersonator. They moved their base to Chicago in 1905, and the youngest sister, Alice, joined the company around 1910. Mabel Whitman managed the company after her mother's death in 1909, and in 1910 organized Mabel Whitman and the Dixie Boys, and toured the US and (reputedly) Europe.

Researcher Nadine George-Graves wrote that the sisters were the highest paid act in the Vaudeville circuit. While they claimed to have performed in England for King George V, George-Graves was not able to find evidence to support this. She wrote that "Many other actors started or advanced their careers with the Whitman Sisters' company. People of all races enjoyed their show. Even after Vaudeville was no longer in its prime, they continued to perform in theaters and churches around the nation and were admired by all types of audience members."

According to George-Graves, a typical show during their period of greatest popularity, from about 1909 to 1920, included "jubilee songs and coon shouts, cakewalks and breakdowns, comedians, midgets, cross-dressers, beautiful dancing girls, pickaninnies, a jazz band." Other notable performers in the company at various times included Leonard Reed, Willie Bryant, Jeni Le Gon, Count Basie, Lonnie Johnson, Princess Wee Wee and Bill Robinson.

George-Graves wrote:

Mabel handled all the bookings, Essie designed and executed costumes, Alberta composed music, and Alice, having won cakewalk contests from a child, was billed at the star dancer. Their fast-paced shows, based on a variety format of songs, dances and comedy skits, included a chorus line and jazz band. Alberta cut her hair short, dressed as a man, and excelled as a male impersonator. A singer and flash dancer, "Bert" topped her Strut with high-kicking legomania. Alice was the star of the show and billed as the "Queen of Taps," enhancing such popular dances as Ballin' the Jack, Walkin' the Dog, and the Shim-Sham-Shimmy with clear and clean tapping. She was considered the best female tap dancer in the 1920s.

Essie retired from performing in 1926. After Mabel's death in Atlanta in 1942, the company effectively ceased to exist.

== Legacy ==
Despite their forty years of popularity, information about the sisters all but disappeared. They left no film, nor sheet music, and close to no records, though Essie made some recordings for Black Swan and Paramount in the early 1920s.

The surviving sisters were interviewed in the 1960s by Jean and Marshall Stearns, who included a chapter about the Whitmans in their work Jazz Dance. Their full role was uncovered by the efforts of African American Theater Studies scholar Nadine George-Graves, who analyzed a wealth of local and regional publications, and published her findings in 2000 as The Royalty of Negro Vaudeville: The Whitman Sisters and the Negotiation of Race, Gender and Class in African American Theatre, 1900–1940.

After Essie retired from performing, she became a lay preacher in Chicago. She was married three times and died, aged 80, in a house fire in 1963. Alberta died in Atlanta in 1964, and Alice died in Chicago in 1968. Alice's son, Albert "Pops" Whitman (1919–1950), became a noted tap dancer in his own right.
