= September 1921 =

Month of 1921

<<	September 1921					>>
Su	Mo	Tu	We	Th	Fr	Sa
				1	2	3
4	5	6	7	8	9	10
11	12	13	14	15	16	17
18	19	20	21	22	23	24
25	26	27	28	29	30

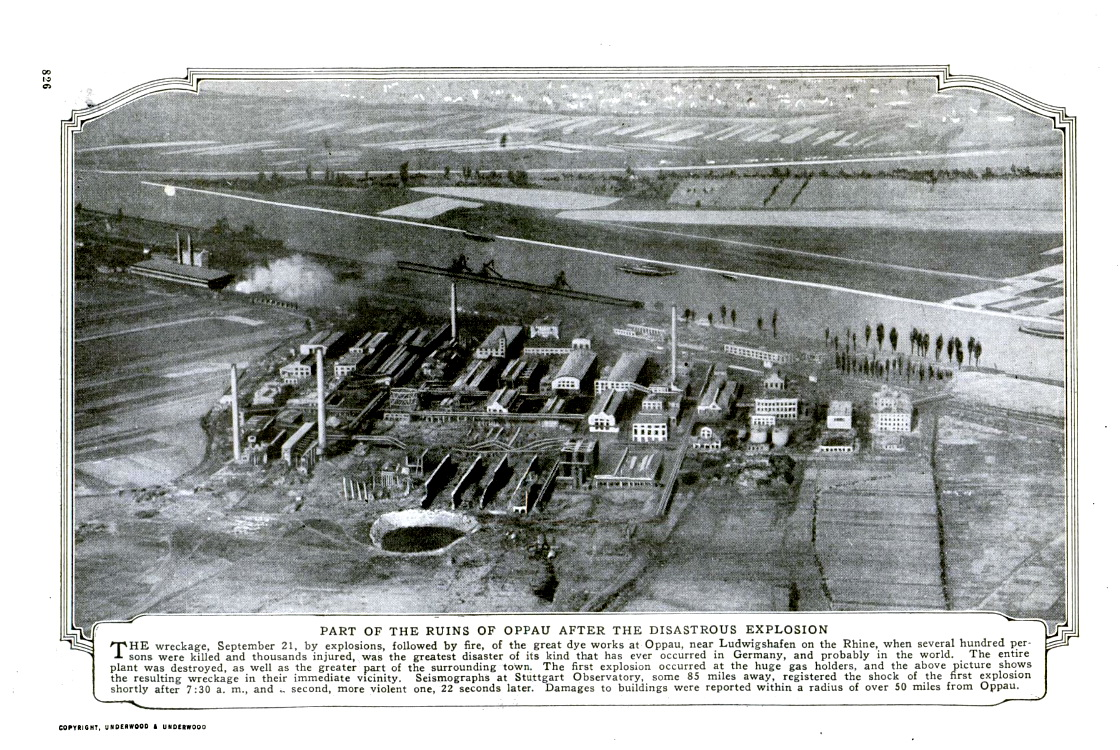
September 21, 1921: 560 people killed in explosion at BASF chemical factory in Germany

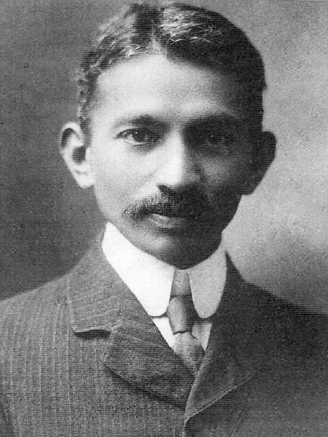
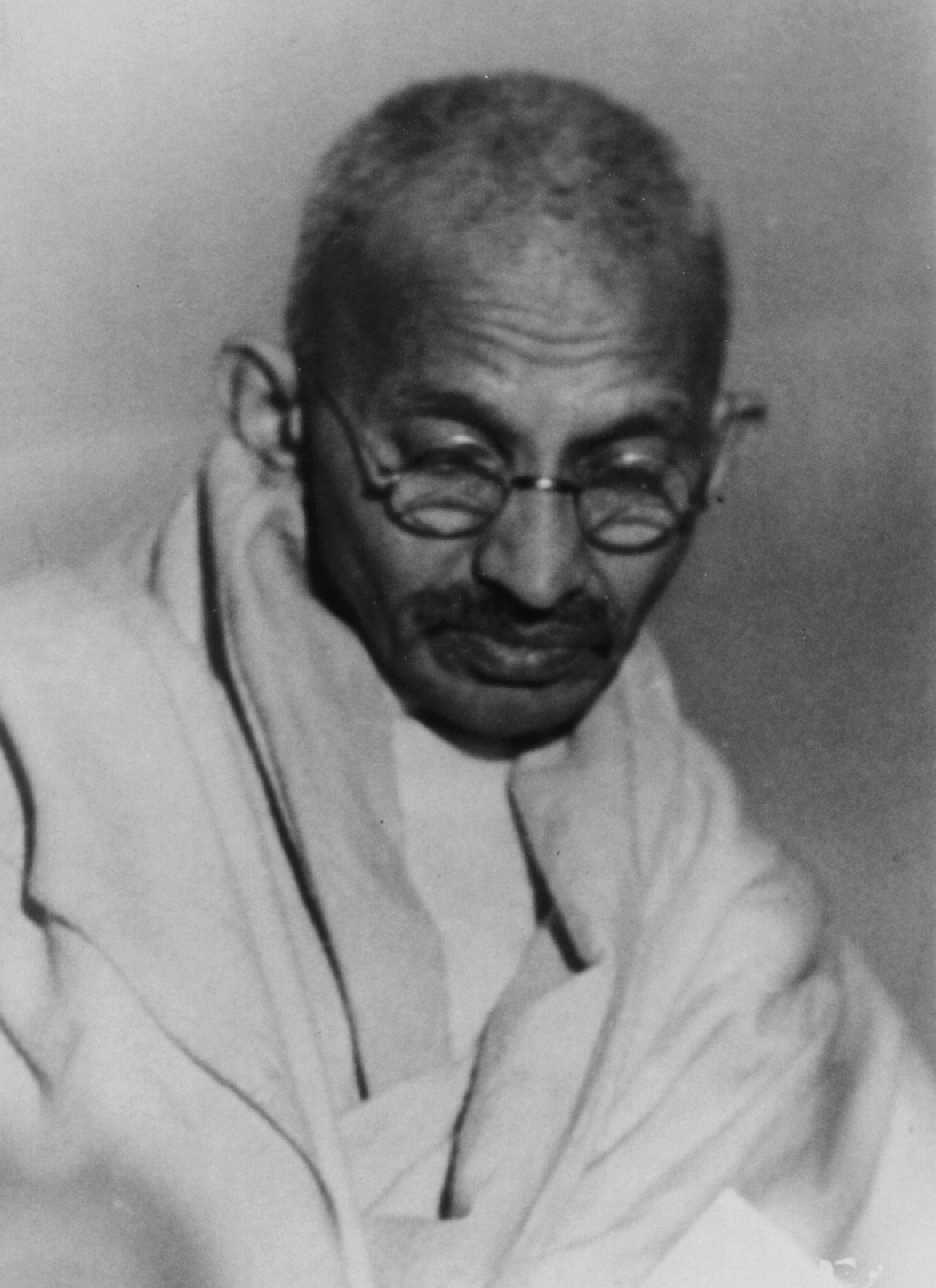
September 22, 1921: The Mahatma Gandhi switches to traditional Indian attire

The following events occurred in September 1921:

== September 1, 1921 (Thursday) ==
- The “Poplar Rates Rebellion” broke out in London after several members of Poplar Borough Council were arrested, including council leader, George Lansbury, for refusing to hand over payments to London County Council.
- The first "superdreadnought" of the U.S. Navy, USS Washington, was launched at Camden, New Jersey. With an all-electric-driven engine, the warship had eight 16 inches (410 mm) guns and was capable of a speed of 21 knots.
- The League of Nations Supreme Council appointed an international commission to determine the Silesian boundary between Germany and Poland, with Paul Hymans of Belgium, Dr. V. K. Wellington Koo of China, Count Quinones de Leon of Spain and Dr. Gastoa de Cunha of Brazil.

== September 2, 1921 (Friday) ==
- The first U.S. Army troops arrived in the state of West Virginia, reaching St. Albans by train to restore order to Mingo County and other areas where thousands of coal miners and strikebreakers were preparing to fight each other. A spokesman for U.S. President Warren G. Harding said that the administration would delay an actual proclamation of martial law in affected counties except as a last resort, noting that "martial law can never exist where courts are open and in the proper and unobstructed exercise of their jurisdiction."
- International famine aid to Russia began as 28,000 tons of food were loaded on trains at Riga in Latvia, of which 20,000 tons were from the U.S. and 8,000 tons from European nations.
- U.S. Army General Leonard Wood announced that he would accept the appointment by U.S. President Harding to become the new Governor-General of the Philippines.
- The Kingdom of Norway signed a trade agreement giving diplomatic recognition to the government of Soviet Russia. Trade Minister Johan Ludwig Mowinckel signed at Oslo on behalf of Norway, which ratified the treaty on October 1.
- The Asociacion Argentina de Tennis was founded.
- The Football Association of Ireland held its first meeting, in Dublin.
- Died:
  - Austin Dobson, 81, British poet who introduced various forms of French poetry into the English language, including the triolet, the ballade and the rondeau.
  - Anthony F. Lucas (Antonio Francisco Luchich), 65, Croatian-born American engineer, inventor and oil driller who struck the 1901 "Spindletop gusher" that spurred the oil boom in Texas.
  - Napoleone Colajanni, 74, Italian socialist politician and theorist, member of the Italian Chamber of Deputies since 1890

== September 3, 1921 (Saturday) ==
- On the first full day of U.S. Army intervention in the Battle of Blair Mountain in Mingo County, West Virginia, about 400 of 4,000 armed miners agreed to disarm and surrendered their weapons to the federal troops. Most miners in the insurrection fled into the West Virginia hills, and many hid their weapons.
- Representatives of U.S. oil companies signed an agreement with the government of Mexico after negotiating a favorable tariff on Mexican petroleum exports.
- The Republic of China appointed Dr. W. W. Yen to be its chief delegate to the November arms limitation conference.
- The SS Abessinia, a German-registered cargo ship, was wrecked on Knivestone in the Farne Islands off the coast of England, after being surrendered to the United Kingdom by Germany as part of World War One reparations. The wreckage can still be seen in the North Sea and the site is popular with divers.
- Ernest Hemingway, at the time a 22-year old American journalist, married 30-year old Elizabeth Hadley Richardson, the first of four marriages for Hemingway. The couple would divorce in 1927 after his affair with Pauline Pfeiffer.

== September 4, 1921 (Sunday) ==
- Irish Nationalist Éamon de Valera replied to the July 20 proposals by British Prime Minister David Lloyd George and rejected the idea of limited self-government within the UK for southern Ireland. De Valera insisted on Dominion status similar to that of other dominions such as Canada, the end of British armed forces occupation, freedom from British acts of Parliament and a unity with the province of Northern Ireland.
- A treaty between the United States and the Kingdom of Siam (now Thailand) went into effect, with the U.S. giving up extraterritorial rights within Siam and Siam gaining full fiscal autonomy.
- The Emirate of Afghanistan ratified a treaty of non-interference with the Soviet Union.
- France agreed to accept reparations of building supplies worth seven billion German marks as a substitute for German gold.
- The first Italian Grand Prix was staged on a 10.7-mile (17.2 km) series of roads near the village of Montichiari in the province of Brescia. The race would be moved in 1922 to a specially-built tract near Milan at the Autodromo Nazionale di Monza.
- Prince Hirohito of Japan returned home after completing his tour of Europe. He would not return to Europe until almost exactly 50 years later, as the first Emperor of Japan to depart the nation.
- Born:
  - Ariel Ramírez, Argentine composer, in Santa Fe (died 2010)
  - Atasi Barua, Indian painter, in Shantiniketan, Bengal Province, British India (d. 2016)

== September 5, 1921 (Monday) ==
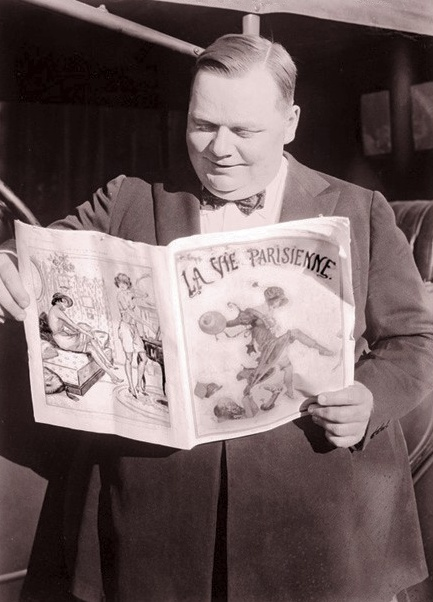
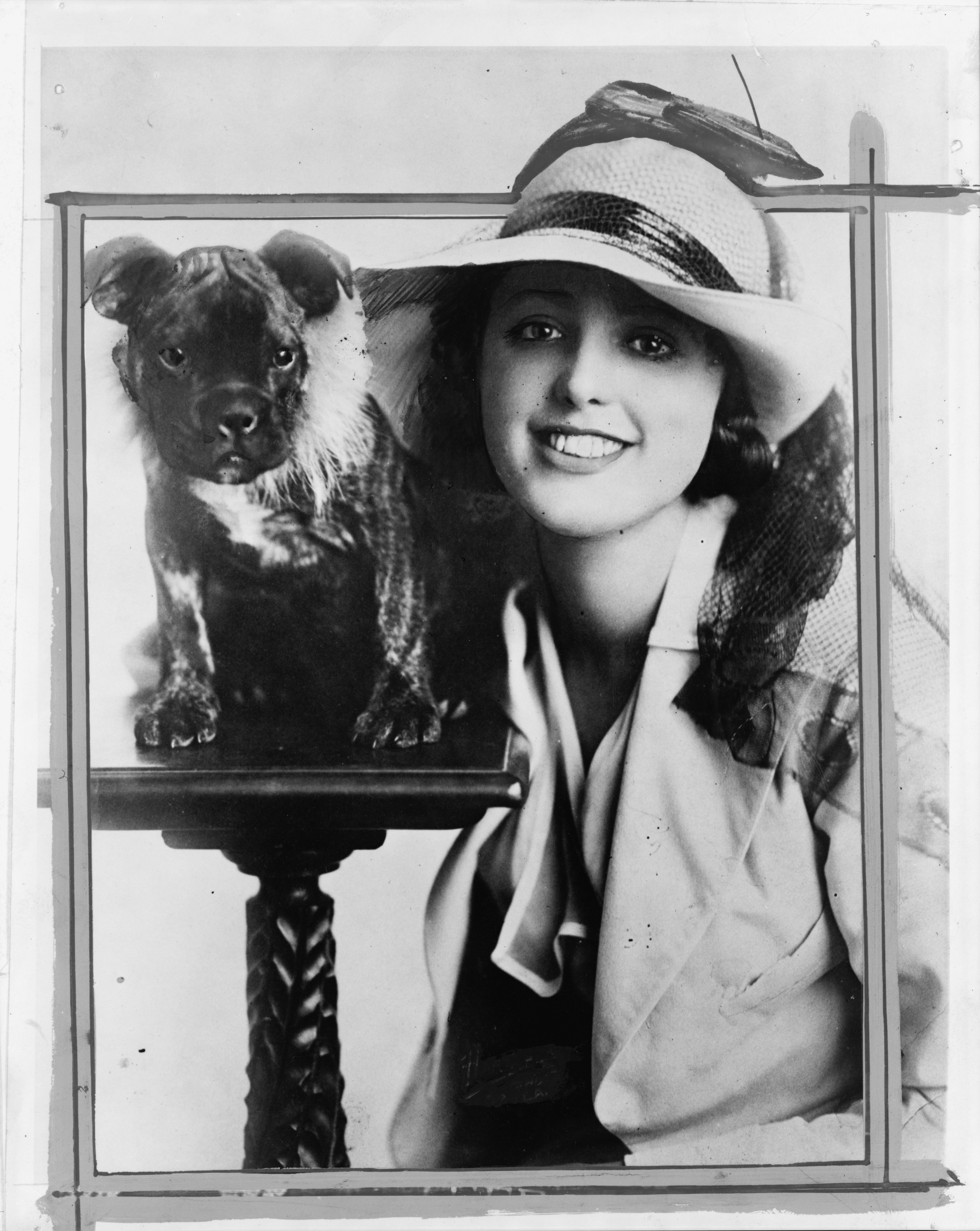
Arbuckle and Rappe
- American actress Virginia Rappe attended a party hosted by film comedian Roscoe "Fatty" Arbuckle at a suite at the St. Francis Hotel in San Francisco. Rappe died four days later from a ruptured bladder and peritonitis. Arbuckle was subsequently arrested under allegations he had raped Rappe, causing her death.
- As the second plenary session of the League of Nations opened in Geneva, the League admitted five new member nations (Albania, Austria, Bulgaria, Finland and Luxembourg) and elected Netherlands Foreign Minister Herman van Karnebeek as the new President of the League Assembly.
- The Teatro Nacional Cervantes was inaugurated in Buenos Aires, Argentina.
- The 16th International Lawn Tennis Challenge (later renamed the Davis Cup), was retained by the United States, after they defeated Japan 5–0 in the challenge round.
- Born:
  - Eddy Goldfarb, American toy inventor known for creating the popular Stompers toy cars (1980), the Vac-U-Form (1961), and the chattering teeth novelty (1949); as Adolph Edward Goldfarb in Chicago
  - Queen Farida, consort of King Farouk of Egypt; in Gianaclis (d. 1988)
  - Carsten Bresch, German geneticist; in Berlin (d. 2020)
  - Edna Reed Clayton DeWees, one of the first women to be elected a county sheriff in the United States (for Loving County, Texas in 1945); in Mississippi (d. 2009)

== September 6, 1921 (Tuesday) ==
- A New York City daily newspaper, the New York World began its exposé of the Ku Klux Klan The series ran for 21 consecutive days, finishing on September 26, and was picked up by 15 major U.S. newspapers.
- The Peace Arch, situated near the westernmost point of the Canada–United States border, between the communities of Surrey, British Columbia and Blaine, Washington, one of the first earthquake-resistant structures built in North America, was publicly dedicated to commemorate 100 years of peace between the U.S. and Canada. Samuel Hill, the president of the Pacific Highway Association, had conceived the idea in 1914 as a centennial of the ratification (on February 17, 1815) of the Treaty of Ghent, which ended the War of 1812, but construction and fundraising had been delayed by World War One.
- Born:
  - N. Joseph Woodland, U.S. inventor known for his creation (in 1951) of the barcode, in Atlantic City, New Jersey (d. 2012)
  - Michael Streicher, German-born American metallurgist known for his development of corrosion-resistant alloys by creating the "Streicher test" of ferric sulfate and sulfuric acid to test durability; in Hamburg (d. 2006)

== September 7, 1921 (Wednesday) ==
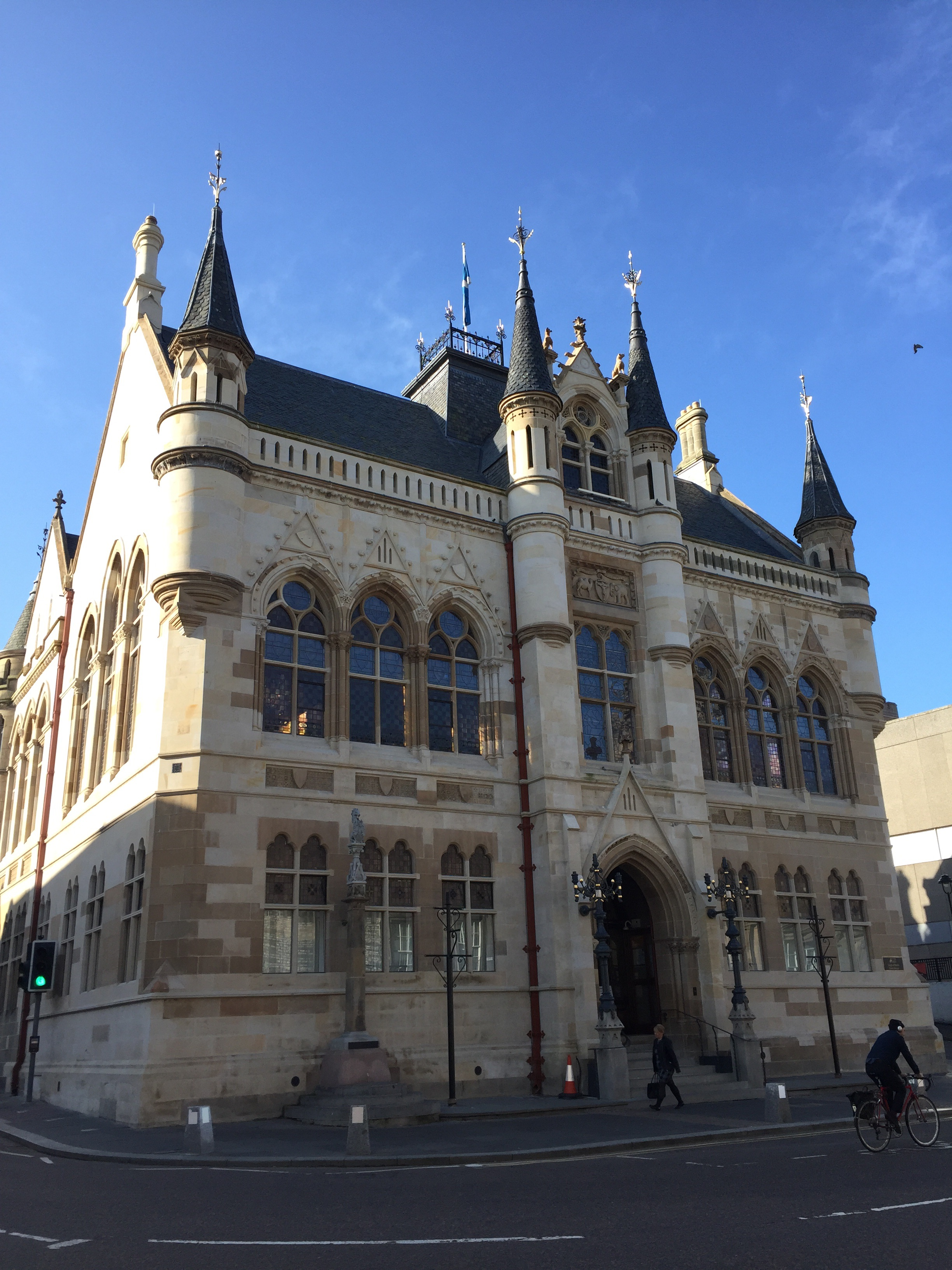
The Town House

- The British government cabinet met outside of England for the first time, holding an emergency session at the Town House of the city of Inverness in Scotland. Prime Minister Lloyd George was on vacation in nearby Gairloch. From the meeting came the government's counteroffer to Ireland's Éamon de Valera, proposing a September 20 conference at Inverness in Scotland with Dáil Éireann delegates on the condition that Ireland agree to remain within the British Empire.
- The Army of Nicaragua successfully repelled Nicaraguan rebels who were attempting to invade the Central American nation from neighboring Honduras. After the rebels fled back across the border, 1,300 of them were captured by troops of the Army of Honduras.
- Distribution of American famine relief for Russia began in Petrograd (now Saint Petersburg) as kitchens were opened and food was distributed.
- Major League Baseball Commissioner and former judge K. M. Landis, who had agreed to be the arbitrator in a dispute between unionized construction workers and construction firms, ordered a reduction of up to one-third in the wages of the laborers, from $1.25 an hour to 70¢ an hour.
- The British-registered ocean liner Almanzora ran aground at Porto, Portugal. Her 1,200 passengers were taken off the following day, and the ship was refloated on September 13.
- Born:
  - Alfred Schild, Turkish-born American theoretical physicist (d. 1977)
  - René Derolez, Belgian philologist and specialist in the study of rune inscriptions; in Aalst (d. 2005)
- Died:
  - Johann Christoph Neupert, 78, founder of the Neupert company that manufactured pianos and harpsichords.
  - John Tamatoa Baker, 69, Hawaiian-born politician who served as the governor of the Island of Hawaii within the Kingdom of Hawaii during 1892 and 1893.

== September 8, 1921 (Thursday) ==
- The Soviet government of Russia denied the Allied Relief Commission authority to investigate famine conditions in the Russian interior.
- The American representatives for the November 11 arms limitation conference scheduled for Washington were named, to be led by U.S. Secretary of State Charles Evans Hughes, former Secretary of State Elihu Root, and to include both the Republican and Democratic U.S. Senate leaders, Henry Cabot Lodge and Oscar W. Underwood.
- Soviet troops completed their withdrawal from the short-lived Soviet Republic of Gilan, following negotiations with Persia.
- U.S. philanthropist Urbain Ledoux, who billed himself as "Mister Zero", staged a job fair in Boston in which he displayed 150 unemployed job seekers on an auction block in the same manner of slaves, including having the men pose shirtless, to be "auctioned off" to potential employers.
- British Prime Minister David Lloyd George offered Ireland's new leader Éamon de Valera a compromise allowing Ireland limited sovereignty within the British Empire.

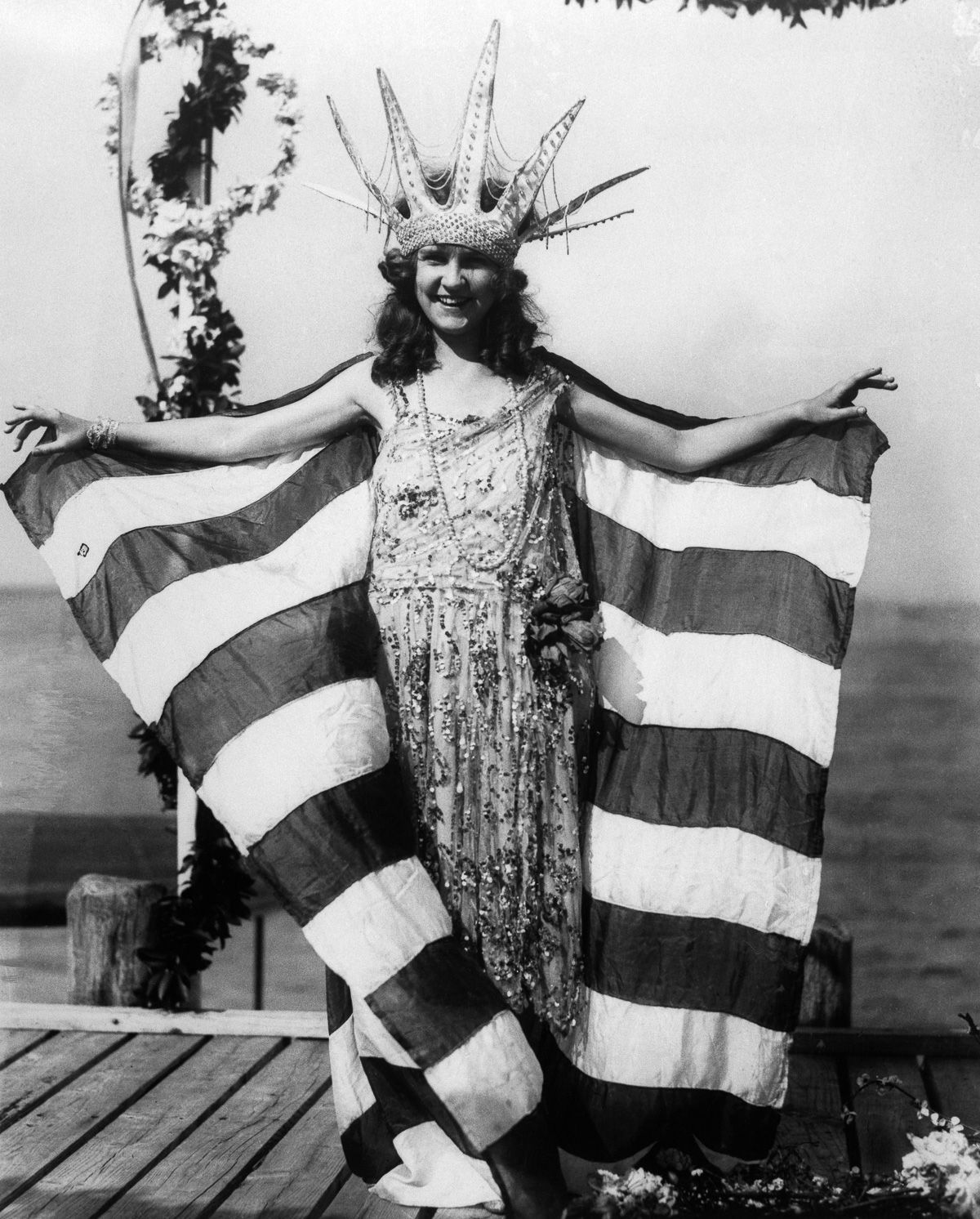
Miss Gorman, the first Miss America

- Margaret Gorman was crowned the first Miss America at a beauty pageant in Atlantic City, New Jersey, United States.
- U.S. Marine Sergeant Theodore B. Crawley set a new world record for marksmanship, shooting 177 consecutive bullseyes with a U.S. Army standard rifle from a distance of 800 yards (730 m) in a competition at Camp Perry in Ohio. The previous world record was 106 bullseyes in a row.
- Born: Harry Secombe, Welsh entertainer, in Swansea (d. 2001)

== September 9, 1921 (Friday) ==
- The Cunard Line ship RMS Aquitainia set a speed record in crossing the Atlantic Ocean, averaging 22.45 knots (25.835 miles per hour (41.577 km/h)) in making the run from Cherbourg to New York in 5 days, 16 hours and 57 minutes.
- The Praya East Reclamation Scheme was launched with an order from the Hong Kong government.
- The Ku Klux Klan announced that it would take legal action for libel against any publications that reprinted the ’’New York World’’ exposé of its activities.
- A group of 18 federal agents of the U.S. narcotics squad raided the Greek ocean liner King Alexander while it was anchored in New York and fought a gun battle, wounding five members of the crew, beating 20 more, and arresting 326 people after being tipped off that the ship was smuggling narcotics and liquor. The agents reportedly seized more than one million dollars' worth of illegal cargo, but were unable to catch the leader of the narcotics ring, Sabas Meninthis, who was the fourth officer of the King Alexander. New York Harbor police fired at the federal agents, mistaking them as smugglers. One hour after the raid, the leader of the narcotic squad raiders, Frank J. Fitzpatrick, committed suicide by shooting himself in the chest.
- Born: Mohamed Abdel Ghani el-Gamasy, Egyptian military officer and commander of Egypt's armed forces during the 1973 Yom Kippur War against Israel; in al-Batanun, Monufia Governorate (d. 2003)
- Died:
  - Akbar Allahabadi (pen name for Syed Akbar Hussain), 74, Urdu language satirical poet in India
  - Dr. Peter Freyer, 70, pioneering Irish genitourinary surgeon
  - Virginia Rappe, 30, American film actress who had been raped four days earlier at a party hosted by Fatty Arbuckle, died of peritonitis from a ruptured bladder (b. 1891)

== September 10, 1921 (Saturday) ==
- At least 215 people were killed in a flash flood of the Brazos River and its tributaries in the U.S. state of Texas. In San Antonio, 51 people died as waters 12 feet (3.7 m) high rushed through the downtown business district. Hardest hit was the town of Taylor, Texas, where 87 people drowned after 39.7 inches (1,010 mm) of rain fell in 36 hours in Williamson County.
- Thirty-four people in Chester, Pennsylvania were killed when a wooden footbridge on Third Street collapsed. A group of about 60 men, women and children had crowded the old structure to watch the recovery of a drowning victim, when the bridge fell 15 feet (4.6 m) into the river.
- Thirty-eight people were killed and 60 more injured in France in the derailment of a Paris à Lyon et à la Méditerranée (PLM) express train shortly at the station at Les Échets, after departing Lyon for Strasbourg. Most of the casualties were French Army soldiers who were returning to Alsace after being on furlough.
- The first ascent of the steep north face of the Eiger, the 13,015 feet (3,967 m) mountain in the Alps of Switzerland, was made by a team of four climbers, Maki Yūkō of Japan, and Fritz Steuri, Fritz Amatter and Samuel Brawand of Switzerland.

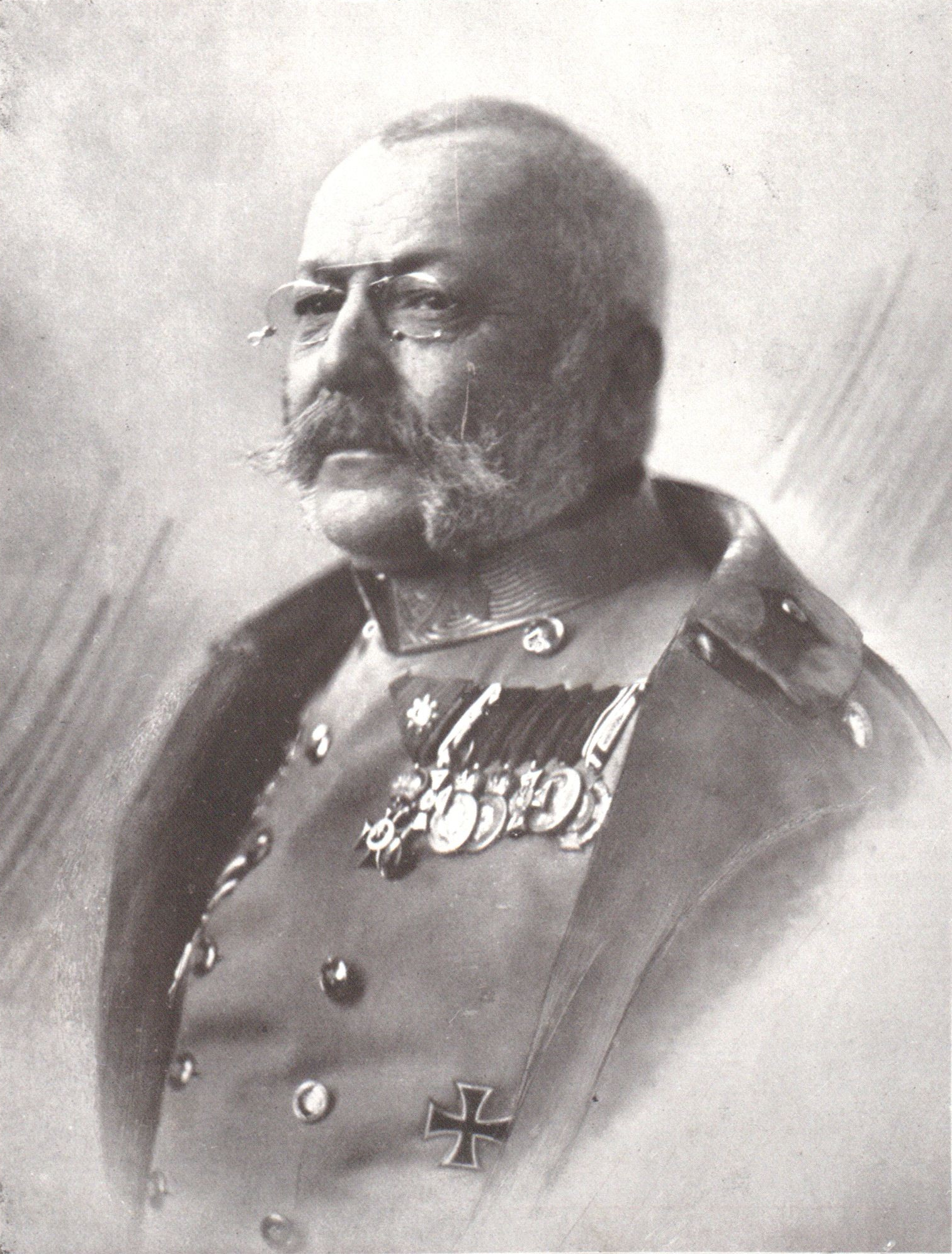
Duke of Teschen

- Archduke Friedrich of Austria, the Duke of Teschen and former Supreme Commander of the Austro-Hungarian forces during World War One, sold almost all of his estates in Austria (including castles, apartment buildings, mining operations, the Albertina Museum in Vienna and one million acres of Austrian land — more than 1,500 square miles (3,900 km^{2}) — to an American business syndicate of investors, headed by J. P. Morgan & Co. president Charles H. Sabin.
- American silent film star Roscoe "Fatty" Arbuckle was arrested in San Francisco and charged with the murder of Virginia Rappe after allegations made by Bambina Maude Delmont. Rappe had died the day before in Wakefield Sanitarium due to a ruptured bladder and secondary peritonitis, which Delmont claimed stemmed from an assault by Arbuckle. Within a few days, movie theaters in California, and then in the rest of the United States, announced that they would not show Arbuckle's films, including the recently released Crazy to Marry.
- "Camp Ross", a part of the U.S. Navy's Great Lakes Naval Station, was signed over to the United States Veterans' Bureau for use as a hospital.
- Born: Vaddadi Papaiah, Indian painter and illustrator for Telugu language publications, usually under the pen name "Vapa"; in Srikakulam, Madras Province, British India (now in Andhra Pradesh state) (d. 1992)

== September 11, 1921 (Sunday) ==
- An earthquake measuring 7.6 occurred in Indonesia, causing minor damage on Java and a small tsunami.
- The three member nations of the proposed Federation of Central America— El Salvador, Guatemala and Honduras— chose Tegucigalpa, capital of Honduras, to be the Federation capital.
- The Jewish village of Nahalal was established as the first moshav ovdim, a cooperative settlement for resident families. Nahalal was constructed on land purchased by the Palestine Land Development Company from the family that leased the land to Arab homesteaders and included all but 180 hectares (445 acres) of the Palestinian village of Ma'alul.
- Died:
  - Prince Louis of Battenberg, 67, Austrian-born German nobleman and British admiral, First Sea Lord for Britain at the beginning of World War One; from heart failure
  - Subramania Bharathi, 38, Indian independence activist and Tamil language writer, poet and songwriter, and a pioneer of modern Tamil literature.

== September 12, 1921 (Monday) ==
- The Soviet Union declared war on the Kingdom of Romania in order to reclaim the territory of Bessarabia, 18,000 square miles (47,000 km^{2}) of territory awarded from the Russian Empire to Romania by the Allied Supreme Council in 1919.
- The government of the British Mandate for Palestine signed an agreement to provide for electric power infrastructure for most of the future nation of Israel, granting Pinchas Rutenberg's Jaffa Electric Company the exclusive right to use a 70-year concession to generate hydroelectric power from the Yarkon River.
- Dock workers in parts of Ireland were forced to accept a reduction of one shilling per day in their wages because of a downturn in the industry.
- The State Alien Poll Tax law in California was declared unconstitutional in a unanimous decision of The Supreme Court of California

== September 13, 1921 (Tuesday) ==
- The three-week Battle of Sakarya in the Greco-Turkish War concluded when the Turks were able to force the surrender of the Greeks and proved a turning point in the conflict. Roughly 4,000 people died on each side.
- The first White Castle hamburger restaurant opened, in Wichita, Kansas, marking the foundation of the world's first fast food chain of restaurants.
- German aircraft designer Friedrich Harth set a world record for staying aloft in a glider for more than 20 minutes (21 minutes, 37 seconds). Harth began his descent from the plateau of Die Wasserkuppe, at 3,117 feet (950 m) the highest of Germany's Rhön Mountains, in a Harth-Messerschmitt S8 sailplane. At an altitude of about 230 feet (70 m), 21 minutes and 37 seconds after his flight began, Harth crashed when a control cable for the S8 jammed and he was unable to maneuver the aircraft. Harth survived, but with serious injuries.
- In a demonstration at Pittsfield, Massachusetts, the General Electric Company transmitted one million volts of electricity for the first time. The accomplishment was made possible by the work of engineers F. W. Peak Jr.; G. Faccioli; and W. S. Moody.
- U.S. Army Brigadier General William "Billy" Mitchell, in a report to his commanding officer, Major General Menoher, issued a strong dissent to a report that concluded that battleships were superior to aerial bombardment, and recommended that the U.S. Department of War and the U.S. Department of the Navy be consolidated into a single "U.S. Department of National Defense", with the Army, Navy and a proposed U.S. Air Service to be sub-departments.
- In the Lewisham West by-election to the British House of Commons, brought about by the death of Unionist MP Sir Edward Coates, Unionist candidate Philip Dawson was elected by only 47 votes.
- Born: Cyrille Adoula, Congolese trade unionist and politician and fourth Prime Minister of the Republic of the Congo; in Léopoldville, Belgian Congo (now Kinshasa, Democratic Republic of Congo) (d. 1978)
- Died:
  - Samuel M. Taylor, 69, U.S. Representative for Arkansas since 1913
  - Oscar A. King, 70, American neurologist who constructed multiple sanitariums to treat psychiatric problems.

== September 14, 1921 (Wednesday) ==
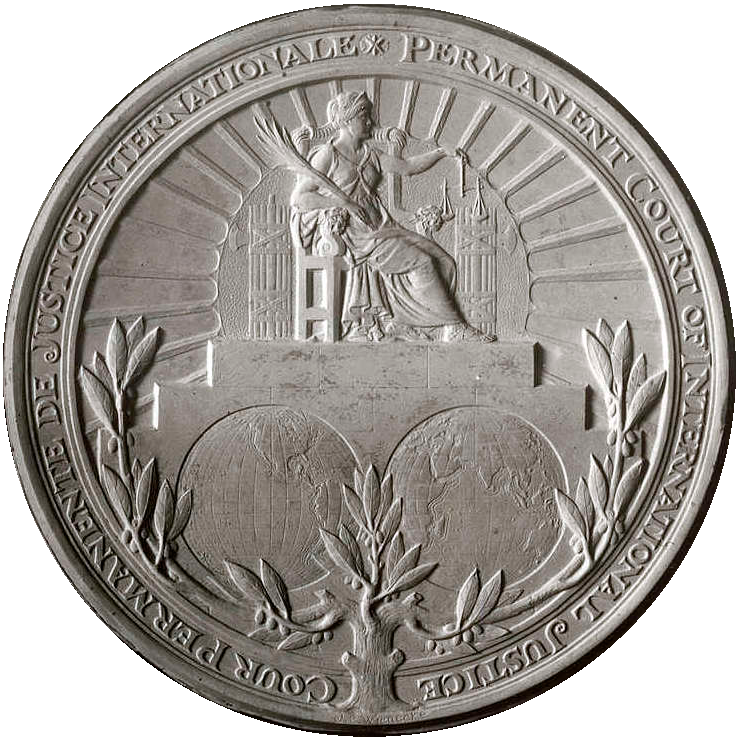
The "World Court" seal

- The League of Nations confirmed the eleven justices of the first "World Court", the Permanent Court of International Justice, representing eleven nations and to serve a nine-year term.
- In Munich, Nazi Party leader Adolf Hitler and editor Hermann Esser disrupted a meeting of the Bavarian League (Der Bayernbund) and got into a fight with Bavarian secessionist leader Otto Ballerstedt. Hitler served one month in jail for assault. After becoming Fuehrer of Germany, Hitler would arrange for Ballerstedt's assassination in 1934.
- The Dáil Éireann agreed to bring a delegation of five representatives to a meeting with the British government in Inverness, including Dáil Éireann Foreign Minister Arthur Griffith and Finance Minister Michael Collins, but refused to drop its demand for complete independence. Prime Minister Lloyd George canceled the conference the next day.
- Ten employees of the Atlantic Refining Company in Philadelphia were killed, and eight seriously injured, in the fiery explosion of a high-pressure naphtha distillery. Another 20 were less seriously hurt by the blast, which had sent a spray of burning oil across the factory floor.
- The Honduras national soccer football team and Guatemala's national soccer football team both made their international debut, playing against each other at Guatemala City. Honduras (now called La Bicolor), lost to Guatemala (Los Chapines), 9 to 0, although the Honduran team has been more successful in international play, qualifying for the World Cup tournament in 1982, 2010 to 2014.
- Born:
  - Sant Darshan Singh, Indian Spiritual Master and guru; in Kauntrila, Punjab Province, British India (now Pakistan) (d. 1989)
  - Ruth Brooks Flippen, American screenwriter for film and television; in Brooklyn (d. 1981)
  - Dario Vittori, Italian-born Argentine stage, film and TV actor and comedian; in Guidonia Montecelio, near Rome (d. 2001)

== September 15, 1921 (Thursday) ==
- Japan published its note to the Republic of China on terms for the restoration of Japanese control of the Shandong Peninsula. While China would retain nominal jurisdiction, the Japanese would be given economic control of the ports of Qingdao and Jiaozhou Bay.
- Born:
  - Joseph Iléo, twice Prime Minister of the Republic of the Congo (Leopoldville); in Léopoldville (now Kinshasa) Iléo was born in the same week as his successor, Cyrille Adoula (d. 1994)
  - Daji Bhatawadekar (stage name for Krishnachandra Moreshwar), popular Indian stage and film actor, winner of the Sangeet Natak Akademi Award; in Bombay (now Mumbai, British India (d. 2006)
  - Moshe Shamir, Israeli playwright and member of the Knesset; in Safed, Mandatory Palestine (d. 2004)
  - Norma MacMillan, Canadian television voice actress known for the voices of the title characters in Casper the Friendly Ghost and Gumby, and "Davey" in Davey and Goliath; in Vancouver (d. 2001)
- Died: Roman von Ungern-Sternberg, 35, Austrian-born mercenary who took control of the government of Mongolia before being captured by the Soviet Army on August 20, was executed by a firing squad.

== September 16, 1921 (Friday) ==
- The day before leaving on the Shackleton–Rowett Expedition, Antarctic explorer Ernest Shackleton recorded a farewell address on one of the first films with sound, using a process invented, but never put into commercial use, by Harry Grindell Matthews.
- Born: Ursula Franklin, German-born social theorist and metallurgist; as Ursula Maria Martius in Munich (d. 2016)

== September 17, 1921 (Saturday) ==
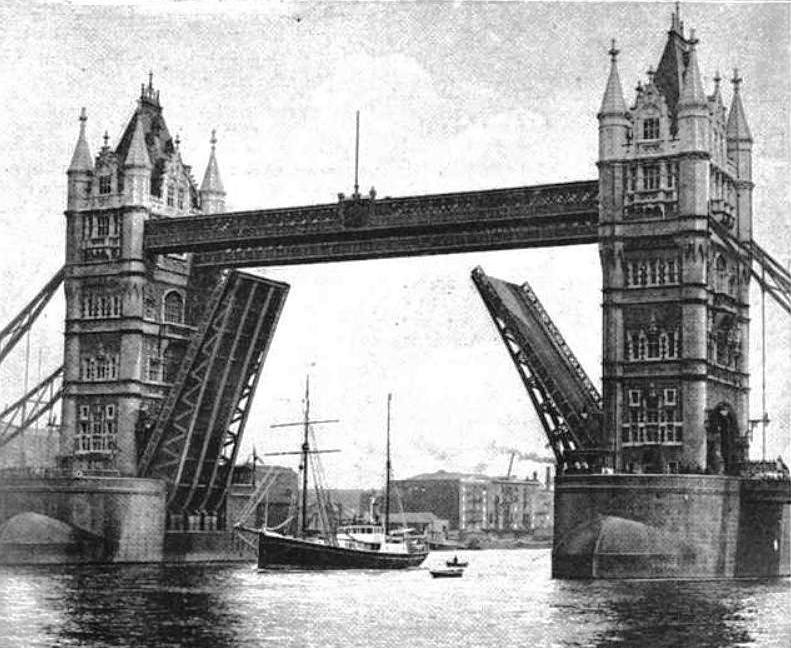
Antarctica-bound Quest

- The Shackleton–Rowett Expedition to Antarctica, led by explorer Ernest Shackleton and financed by John Q. Rowett, departed from the St Katharine Docks of London on the steam-powered schooner Quest.
- The first Air League Challenge Cup competition took place at the Royal Aero Club Aviation Race Meeting at Croydon Airport, UK. The winners were No. 24 Squadron at RAF Kenley, flying an SE.5a on the first and third laps and an Avro 504K on the second lap.
- The first season of the newly established Irish Free State League of Ireland began, with three games involving the soccer football league's six teams. Frank Haine of Bohemians scored the first ever goal in the new league in their 5–0 win against the YMCA. The other scores were Shelbourne 3, Frankfort 1; and St James's Gate 5, Dublin United 1.
- The first fully professional soccer football league in the United States, the American Soccer League (ASL), made its debut with the opening of its inaugural season. In the two scheduled matches, Todd Shipyards F.C. of Brooklyn crushed visiting Jersey City Celtics, 7 to 0. and Harrison S.C. and host |New York FC played to a 2 to 2 draw at the New York Oval.
- The Dovre Line rail link between Oslo and Trondheim in Norway was officially opened. The next day, the rail line suffered its first fatal accident.
- The All Blacks and Springboks drew 0–0 in the third and deciding test of their inaugural rugby union series in appalling conditions at Wellington, New Zealand. The All Blacks had won the first test in Dunedin 13-5 and the Springboks had won the second test in Auckland 9 to 5, thus making the three-test series 1-1 and setting the scene for one of the great rivalries in world rugby and sport.
- Born: Virgilio Barco Vargas, President of Colombia from 1986 to 1990, in Cúcuta (d. 1997)

== September 18, 1921 (Sunday) ==
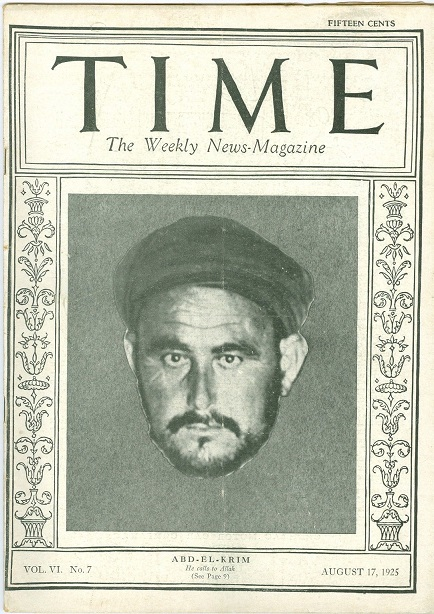
Abd el-Krim

- The Republic of the Rif (Tagduda en Arif), a secessionist nation governed by the Berber people, was founded in Ajdir in Morocco, by Abd el-Krim, the leader of a successful military campaign against the occupying Spanish Army and a rebellion against the Moroccan Arab Sultan.
- Six people were killed the day after the opening of the Dovre Line in Norway, when the inaugural train collided with another train on the Trondhjem–Støren Line. The dead included politician Thomas Heftye, 61; architect Erik Glosimodt, 39; and government executive Nils Johannes Sejersted, 55.
- British Prime Minister Lloyd George informed Irish Republican leader De Valera that a peace conference could not be held unless Ireland withdrew its demand for full sovereignty separate from the United Kingdom.
- The "5x5=25" abstract art exhibition was inaugurated at the Institute for Artistic Culture in Moscow, including works by Aleksandra Ekster, Lyubov Popova, Alexander Rodchenko, Varvara Stepanova and Alexander Vesnin.
- Born: Kamal Hassan Ali, Prime Minister of Egypt 1984 to 1985 and former director of the Mukhabarat, Egypt's counterespionage agency; in Cairo (d. 1993)

== September 19, 1921 (Monday) ==
- Seventy-five coal miners were killed in a series of explosions at an underground mine at Mount Mulligan, Queensland.
- Bill Tilden defeated fellow American Wallace F. Johnson, 6–1, 6–3, 6–1, to win the men's singles title in the U.S. National Championship tennis tournament.
- The first U.S. radio station in New England, WBZ, began broadcasting. Operating from Springfield, Massachusetts and financed by Westinghouse Electric Company, the station used the 300m wavelength (equivalent to 830 kHz AM frequency).
- Born:
  - Paulo Freire, Brazilian philosopher, in Recife (d. 1997)
  - Bimal Kar, Bengali language novelist in India; (d. 2003)

== September 20, 1921 (Tuesday) ==
- The relatively new Principality of Albania asked the League of Nations Assembly to intervene to stop the violation of its borders by the Kingdom of Yugoslavia. The Allied Powers had not determined a fixed boundary after the breakup of the Austro-Hungarian Empire into the Balkan States.
- Republican candidate Thomas S. Crago was elected to the U.S. House of Representatives in Pennsylvania's at-large congressional district, to take the seat vacated by the death of Mahlon Morris Garland.
- Republican candidate Holm O. Bursum defeated Democrat Richard H. Hanna in a special election for U.S. Senator for New Mexico, filling the vacancy caused after former Senator Albert B. Fall resigned in March to become U.S. Secretary of the Interior in the Harding Administration.
- In the U.S. city of Pittsburgh, the KDKA radio station and the Pittsburgh Post-Gazette newspaper created the first "news room" and "news department" in the history of broadcasting.
- Peking Union Medical College, which still trains physicians in the People's Republic of China and still retains its original name, was dedicated in Beijing by members of the China Medical Board and its chairman, John D. Rockefeller Jr.
- Born: Chico Hamilton, U.S. jazz drummer, in Los Angeles (d. 2013)

== September 21, 1921 (Wednesday) ==
- An industrial explosion killed 560 people, and injured 2,000 others after a tower silo containing 4,500 tonnes of ammonium-based fertilizer blew up at the Badische Anilinfabrik Company (BASF) plant and leveled the town of Oppau in Germany. "Put Loss in Oppau at a Billion Marks— 500 Bodies Recovered From 150-Acre Waste of Badische Plant
- The League of Nations approved a resolution to elect a commission to study the feasibility of a League organization for members to exchange cultural, educational and scientific information, which would lead to the creation of the International Committee on Intellectual Cooperation (ICIC) on August 1, 1922, a forerunner of UNESCO.

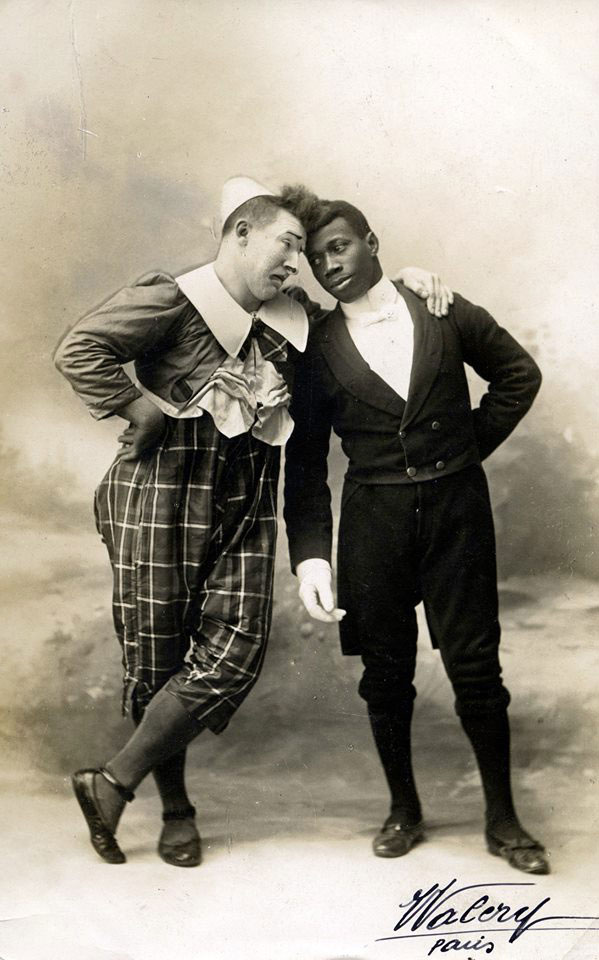
Footit et Chocolat

- Born: Abdullah Idrus, Indonesian novelist and pioneer of the "Angkatan '45" field of Indonesian literature of post-independence work; in Padang, West Sumatra (d. 1979)
- Died:
  - Dr. José Celso Barbosa, 64, Puerto Rican physician and politician who founded the Partido Republicano Puertorriqueño and pioneered the statehood movement in Puerto Rico
  - George Foottit, 57, English circus clown who became famous in France with Rafael "Chocolat" Padilla as "Foottit et Chocolat."
  - Second Lieutenant Ernest Maunoury, 26, French flying ace with 11 aerial victories in World War One, was killed in a plane crash near Cazaux, when a wing fell off of the airplane that he was piloting.
  - Sir Ernest Cassel, 69, Prussian-born British merchant and banker.

== September 22, 1921 (Thursday) ==
- At the city of Madurai in British India, the Mahatma Gandhi, leader of the passive resistance movement against British rule, decided to abandon the Western attire that he had worn as a lawyer, in favor of the traditional robe and loin cloth worn by the poorest of the Indian people. He would continue to dress in the style of the common man for the rest of his life.
- The sinking of the Norwegian cargo ship Salina killed 14 of her 25 crew when the ship collided with the Belgian ship Jan Breydel and sank in the English Channel. Survivors were rescued by the Jan Breydel.
- Dr. Gustav Ritter von Kahr, the right-wing Premier of Bavaria and a sympathizer with the cause of the secession of Bavaria from the Weimar Republic of Germany, was replaced by the moderately conservative Count Hugo von Lerchenfeld of Köfering—Schönberg.
- The Central Legislative Assembly representing the indigenous majority of British India voted to lobby the British government to repeal the repressive Rowlatt Act that permitted colonial authorities to arrest and imprison suspects indefinitely without trial.
- Seethikoya Thangal, leader of rebels in what is now India's state of Kerala, proclaimed himself the Governor of a kingdom based in Kumaramputhur.

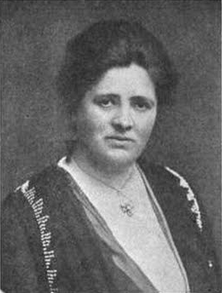
Mrs. Wintringham

- For only the second time in British history, a woman was elected to the House of Commons, as Margaret Wintringham won a by-election held for the Louth constituency in Lincolnshire. Mrs. Wintringham was the widow of Liberal M.P. Thomas Wintringham, the previous holder of the seat.
- Died: Ivan Vazov, 71, Bulgarian poet, playwright and novelist known as "The Patriarch of Bulgarian literature" for his revival of Bulgarian language in modern literary works.

== September 23, 1921 (Friday) ==
- At Geneva, Poland and Germany signed a treaty allowing Germany to retain the independent port of Danzig. After World War II, the "Free State of Danzig" and surrounding communities became a permanent part of Poland as Gdańsk.
- With nine games left in the pennant race in baseball's American League, and six of the AL's eight teams eliminated from contention, the first place New York Yankees (91-53) and the second place Cleveland Indians (92-54) met for the first part of a four-game scheduled regular season series that would ultimately determine who would go to the World Series, and the Yankees won, 4 to 2, to take the lead in the race. Cleveland won the Saturday game, 9 to 0, while the Yankees beat the Indians in the Sunday installment, 21 to 7 and the Monday final, 8 to 7, putting the Indians two games behind the Yankees with only four left to play.
- Johnny Buff (John Lisky) won the world bantamweight boxing championship at the age of 32, defeating titleholder Pete Herman (Peter Gulotta), who had recently reclaimed the title on July 25, in a 15-round bout at Madison Square Garden.
- Born: Joe Hill Louis, American blues musician who died prematurely from a tetanus infection; in Raines, Tennessee (d. 1957)
- Died: Bernard de Romanet, 27, French Army lieutenant and World War One flying ace with 18 aerial victories, later a sporting pilot who broke the world speed record twice in 1920 (with a maximum speed of 192 kilometres per hour (119 mph), was killed in a plane crash while taking part in the qualifying races for the Coupe Deutsch de la Meurthe, where he had planned to reclaim the world speed record from Joseph Sadi-Lecointe. According to witnesses from the ground, it appeared that Romanet had unofficially surpassed 200 kilometres per hour (120 mph) and then 300 kilometres per hour (190 mph) in a Lumière-de Monge racer monoplane but that the fabric on the left wing had torn off, causing him to crash near Étampes. The Monge had recently been converted from a biplane to a monoplane when the lower wings were removed in order to increase speed, and plunged from an altitude of 650 feet (200 m).

== September 24, 1921 (Saturday) ==
- In Budapest, former Hungarian Prime Minister and Austro-Hungarian Foreign Minister Gyula Andrássy escaped an assassination attempt. Anti-monarchist Ibrahim Kover fired five shots at Andrassy and former National Assembly leader Rakovsky, both leaders of the Christian National Union Party (KNEP), which advocated bringing the last ruler of Austria-Hungary, King Karoly IV, back to the throne.
- The first International Eugenics Conference since 1912, and only the second one ever held, was closed in London with an address by British Army Major Leonard Darwin, a eugenicist and politician, as well as the son of Charles Darwin. Major Darwin told the delegates that it was the patriotic duty of "better class" families to propagate because those persons with "superior" genetic traits were "disappearing" while "inferior" citizens were rapidly multiplying.
- The Council of Ambassadors in the League of Nations demanded that Hungary evacuate the Burgenland section of Austria, which Hungarian partisans claimed as "Őrvidék".
- The U.S. Army's Air Service tested its bombing skills on the retired battleship USS Alabama with a simulated bombing using smoke bombs and tear gas, as well as a crew of mannequins substituting for enemy sailors.
- The Council of the League of Nations presented the Hymans Commission report to the League Assembly on the recommended settlement of the dispute between Poland and Lithuania over Vilnius, which Poland's General Lucjan Zeligowski had seized in October.
- Three people were killed near Staten Island in New York when their sailboat was run over by a Cunard Line cruise ship, the RMS Caronia, which had departed New York bound for Liverpool. Harbor police concluded that the engine of the sloop John Anton had stalled as the boat was attempting to steer out of the path of the oncoming Caronia, which sliced the smaller craft in half.
- The first college football game to be held at what is now Neyland Stadium on the campus of the University of Tennessee took place at Shields-Watkins Field, with the UT Volunteers defeating Emory & Henry College, 27 to 0. The bleachers had seating for 3,200 people on opening day; 100 years later, Neyland Stadium would be able to seat more than 30 times as many people, with 102,455 seats.

== September 25, 1921 (Sunday) ==
- Poland's President, Józef Piłsudski, narrowly escaped an assassination attempt in Lwow as Ukrainian activist Stepan Fedak fired at an open car carrying Pilsudski and Lwow Governor Kazimierz Grabowski. Governor Grabowski was struck twice and a third shot struck the car windshield when Pilsudski ducked.
- The first public radio broadcast in Bulgaria was made, as the wireless telegraph station at Sofia transmitted a recording of a concert that it had received from a German radiostation at Nauen.
- Born:
  - Robert Muldoon, Prime Minister of New Zealand from 1975 to 1984; in Auckland (d. 1992)
  - Andy Albeck, Russian-born U.S. film executive and the last president of United Artists before its financial problems forced it to merge with MGM Studios; in Vladivostok (d. 2010)
  - Cintio Vitier, American-born Cuban poet, novelist and intellectual; in Key West, Florida (d. 2009)
  - Lieutenant General Tette "Ted" Meines of the Netherlands Army, member of the Dutch resistance during World War II who saved numerous Jewish children in the Netherlands from deportation; in Huizum (d. 2016)

== September 26, 1921 (Monday) ==
- In elections for the Riksdag in Sweden, the Swedish Social Democratic Party strengthened its share of seats from 75 to 93, and prompted former Prime Minister Oscar von Sydow, who had been unable to govern, to step down on October 4 in favor of Hjalmar Branting. The election was the first in which women were allowed to vote, and the first in which persons formerly disenfranchised for unpaid debts were allowed to participate.
- Joseph Sadi-Lecointe of France became the first person to travel more than 200 miles per hour as he flew his 200-horsepower Nieuport-Delage Sesquiplan airplane at 205.2 miles per hour (330.2 km/h) at an airfield in Dordogne in southwestern France.
- The U.S. National Unemployment Conference was opened in Washington by President Harding, who then turned over the proceedings to Secretary of Commerce Herbert Hoover.
- Born:
  - Mervyn Susser, South African epidemiologist; in Johannesburg (d. 2014)
  - Cyprian Ekwensi, Nigerian novelist, in Minna (d. 2007)
- Died: Walter Russell Lambuth, 66, Chinese-born American Methodist bishop and missionary who established multiple schools and hospitals in China, Korea and Japan.

== September 27, 1921 (Tuesday) ==
- For the first time in more than six years, residents of the United Kingdom were allowed to have alcoholic beverages served to them at pubs, restaurants and hotels in the evening, as restrictions issued in 1915 under the Defence of the Realm Act 1914 (known by the acronym "D.O.R.A.") were lifted. Alcohol could be served up until midnight, and patrons were allowed until 12:30 in the morning to consume their drinks.
- The first radio station in Mexico went on the air, transmitting from the Chapultepec section of Mexico City at 20 watts of power.
- At Evere Airfield in Evere, Belgium, fire broke out in the airplane hangar leased by the Belgian airline SNETA (Syndicat national d'Etude des Transports Aériens), destroying one-third of the company's fleet (seven planes out of 21).
- The Assembly of the League of Nations voted to postpone any further discussion of disarmament for a year, and approved the attendance of its members at the upcoming Washington Disarmament Conference, in accordance with the recommendations made to the League on September 19.
- The Chicago Fire Department announced that an inspection of its records, pertaining to the Great Chicago Fire of October 8, 1871, refuted the myth regarding "Mrs. O'Leary's Cow". The popular story had been that the fire, which had started with a blaze at a barn on 137 DeKoven Street, had been caused when Mrs. Catherine O'Leary had gone into milk a cow on the evening of the fire and that the cow had kicked her, causing her to drop a lantern that set hay in the fire ablaze. A re-examination of the records, made in advance of observances of the 50th anniversary of the event, showed that Mrs. O'Leary had gone to bed at 8:30 that evening, one hour before the fire department had been alerted about the start of a fire.
- Born: Melvin "Slappy" White, African American Vegas comedian and TV actor; in Baltimore (d. 1995)
- Died: Engelbert Humperdinck, 67, German composer

== September 28, 1921 (Wednesday) ==
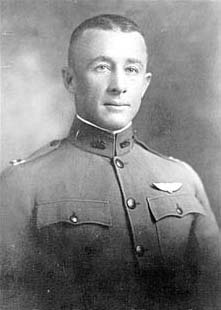
Lt. Macready

- United States Army Air Service Lieutenant John A. Macready, set a new world altitude record of 40,800 feet (12,400 m), flying in the same Packard-Le Peré LUSAC-11 fighter plane that had set a world altitude record on February 27, 1920.
- Born: Joginder Singh, Indian Army hero during the 1962 Sino-Indian War against Communist China, credited with slaying 50 Chinese soldiers in defending the mountain pass at Bum La until being captured and killed, and posthumously awarded India's highest military honor, the Param Vir Chakra; in Mahla Kalan village, Moga district, Punjab Province, British India (d. 1962)
- Died:
  - Princess Pauline von Metternich, 85, Austrian socialite and patron of Richard Wagner
  - Thorvaldur Thoroddsen, 66, Icelandic geologist

== September 29, 1921 (Thursday) ==
- British Prime Minister David Lloyd George sent a new invitation to Ireland's declared President, Éamon de Valera, proposing a "fresh invitation" to negotiations and discussion of Ireland's place as a nation within the British Empire.
- The U.S. Committee on Unemployment Statistics reported record high unemployment in the United States.
- Baseball's New York Giants, with a 93–57 record and three games left to play, clinched the National League pennant after the second-place Pittsburgh Pirates dropped both games of a doubleheader to the third place St. Louis Cardinals, losing the first 5 to 4 and the second 3 to 1, dropping their record to 89–62 with three games left. On September 16 and 17, the Giants had beaten the Pirates 5 to 0 and 6 to 1, the margin of difference, when at the season's end, the Giants finished four games ahead.
- Born:
  - Hedda Lundh, Danish journalist and teacher who served as a resistance leader against the Nazi occupation of Denmark during World War II; in Korsør (d. 2012)
  - Jackie Kahane, Canadian-born American standup comedian who was the warmup act for Elvis Presley's concerts; in Montreal (d. 2001)

== September 30, 1921 (Friday) ==
- The first League of Nations treaty to prohibit human trafficking, the International Convention for the Suppression of the Traffic in Women and Children, was signed in Geneva.
- Éamon de Valera agreed to meet with British Prime Minister David Lloyd George in London on October 11.
- The peace treaty between the United States and Germany was ratified by the German Reichstag by a voice vote after having been approved earlier by the Reichsrat.
- American arbitrator Roland Boyden of the Allied Commission on Reparations ruled that Germany's obligations under the Treaty of Versailles required that reparations payments be made under the exchange rate that had existed for the German mark and the Belgian and French francs that had existed on November 11, 1918. The decision effectively required Germany to pay an additional one billion marks worth of gold to France.
- The first population census of Poland after World War One was taken, and found that Poland had a population of 25,694,700 people, of whom 17,789,287 (or slightly less than 70%) were Polish Catholics. The remaining 30% were 3,898,428 Ruthenians (Eastern Orthodox Poles); 2,048,878 Polish Jews; 1,035,693 Belarusians and 769,392 ethnic Germans.
- Born:
  - Deborah Kerr, Scottish film actress and six-time Academy Award for Best Actress nominee, 1957 Golden Globe winner for Best Actress for The King and I; in Hillhead, Glasgow (d. 2007)
  - Tony Stein, U.S. Marine Corps Corporal and posthumous Medal of Honor recipient for heroism during the Battle of Iwo Jima; in Dayton, Ohio (d. 1945)
- Died: Jean-Baptiste Abel, 58, French colonial administrator and Governor-General of Algeria from 1919 to 1921.
