= October 1921 =

Month of 1921

<<	October 1921					>>
Su	Mo	Tu	We	Th	Fr	Sa
						1
2	3	4	5	6	7	8
9	10	11	12	13	14	15
16	17	18	19	20	21	22
23	24	25	26	27	28	29
30	31

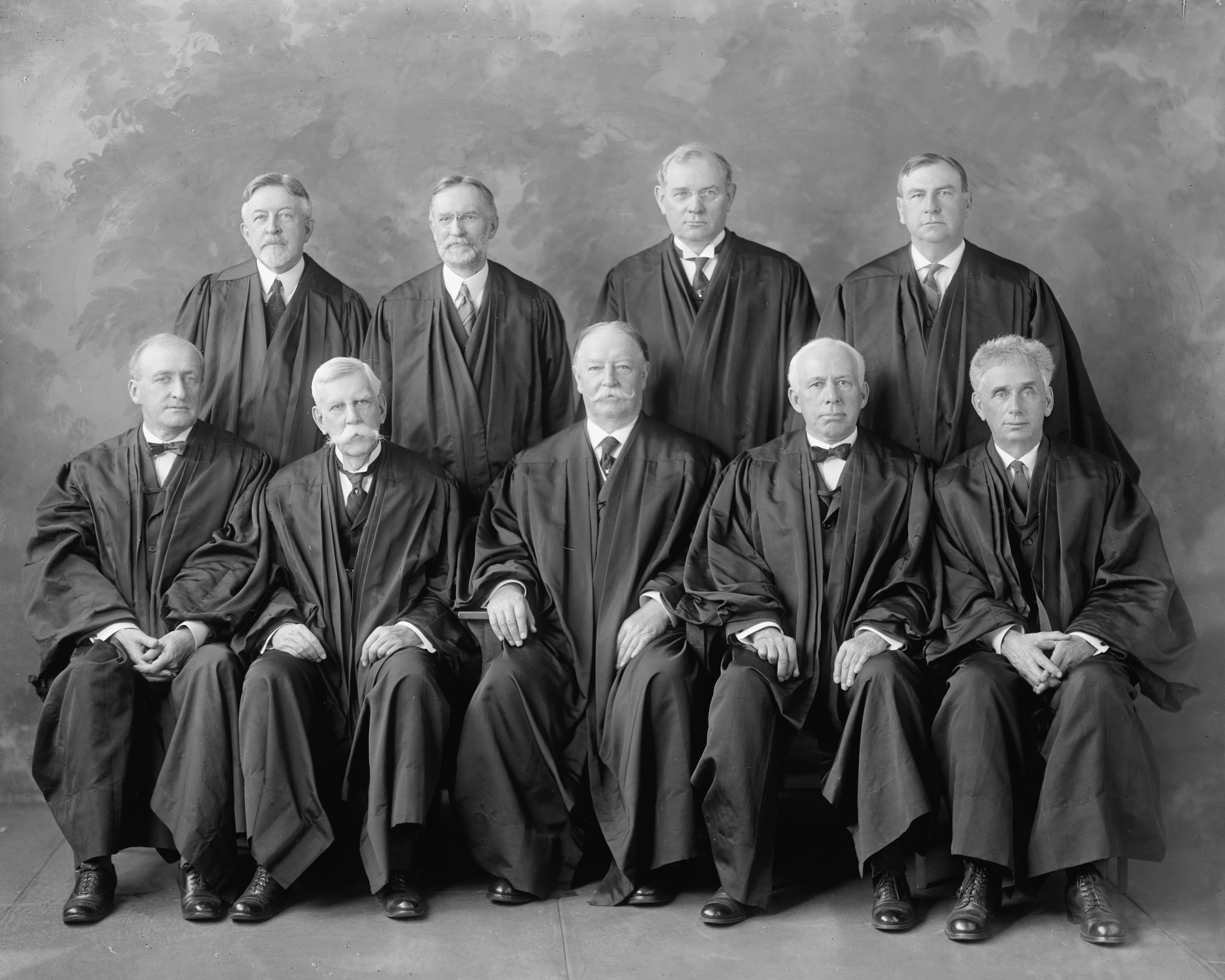
October 3, 1921: Former U.S. President Taft becomes Chief Justice of Supreme Court

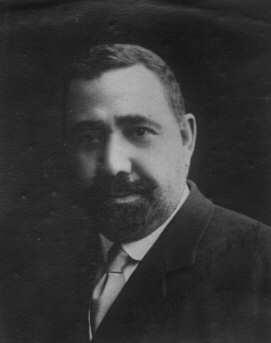
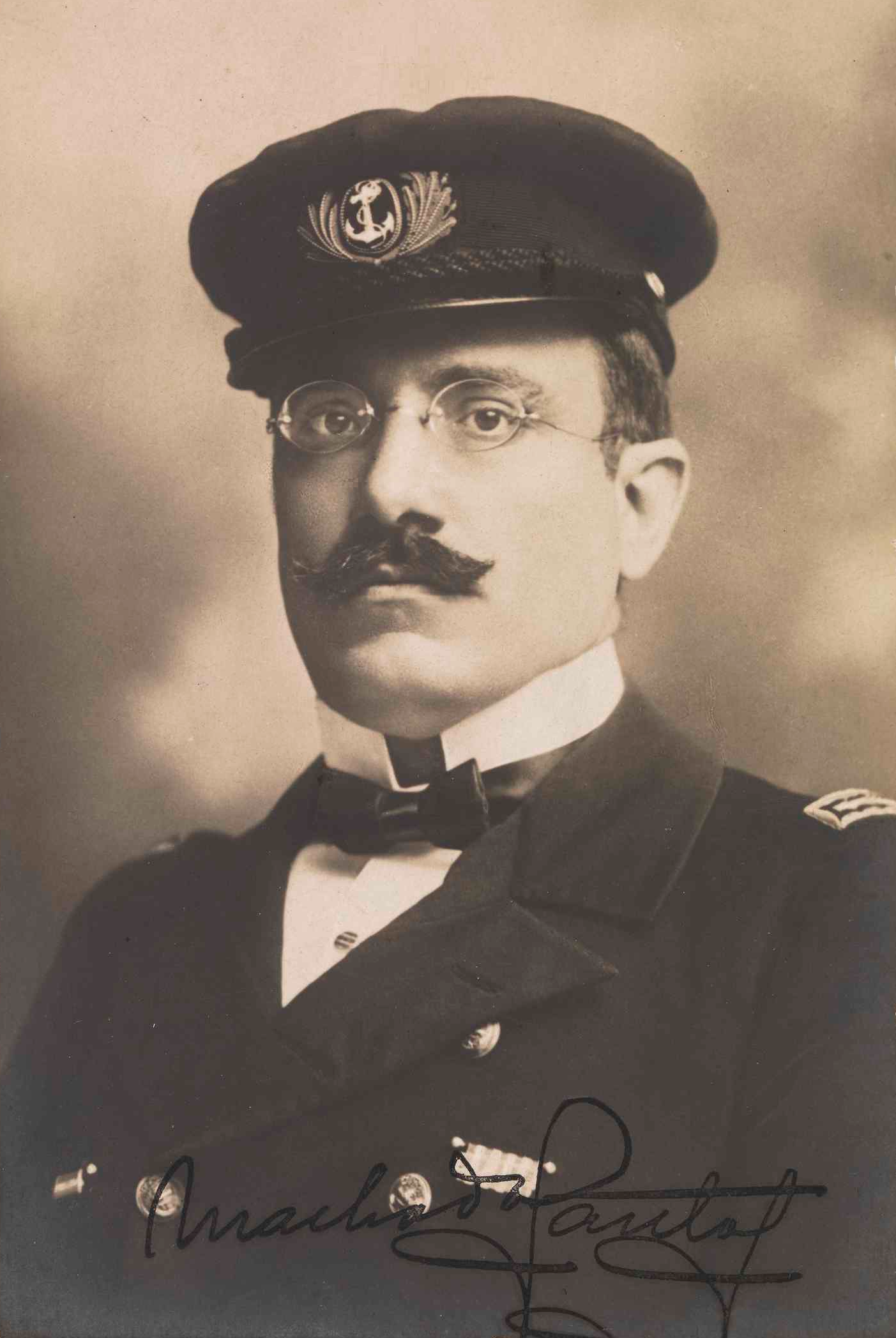
October 19, 1921: Portugal's Premier Granjo and former President Machado assassinated

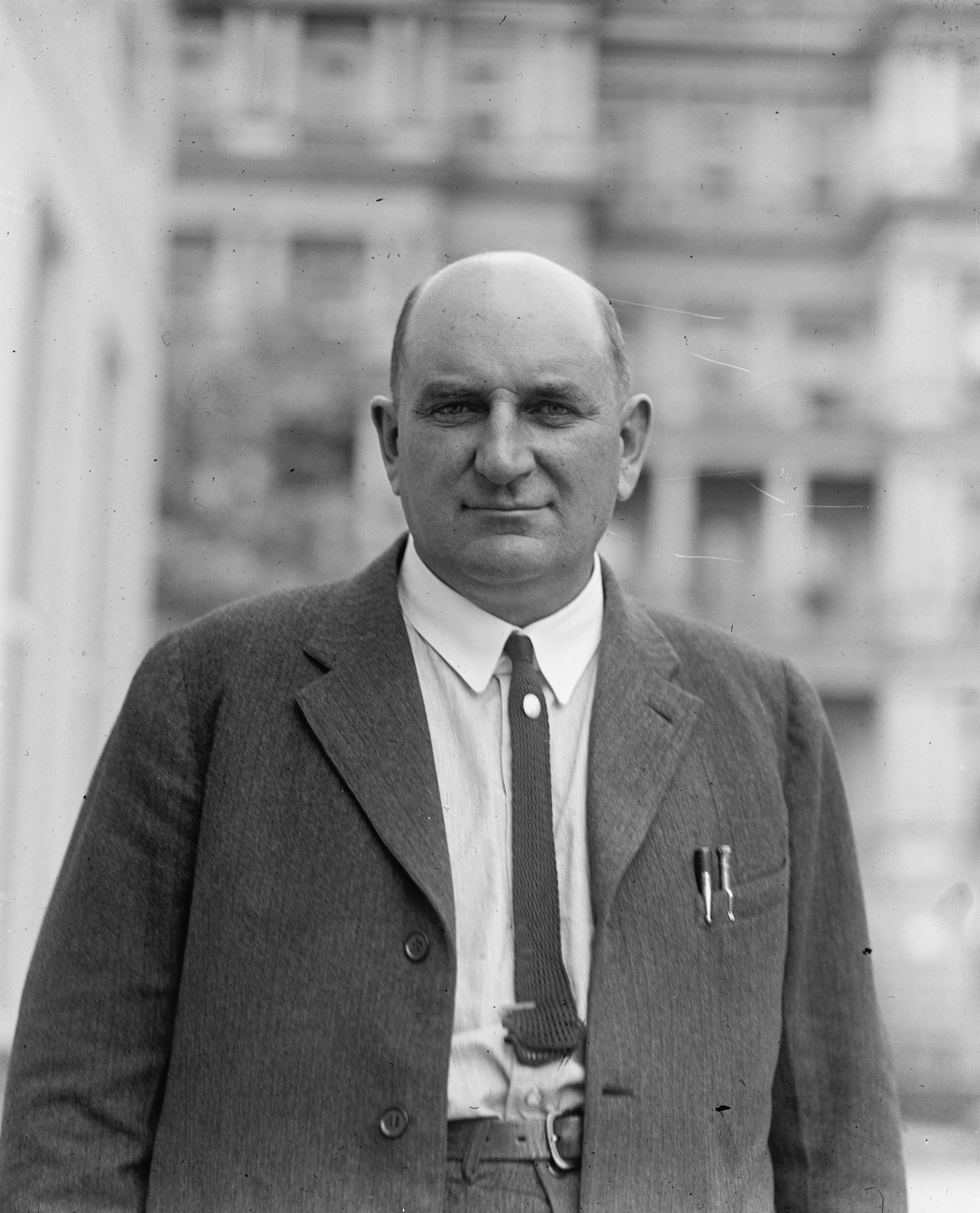
October 28, 1921: North Dakota Governor Lynn Frazier becomes the first U.S. state governor to lose recall election

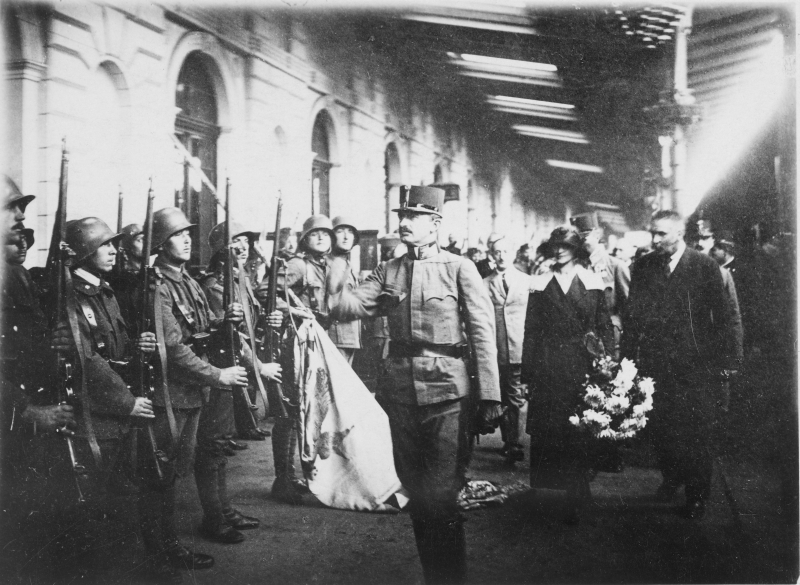
October 20, 1921: Austria-Hungary's former Emperor Charles arrives in Hungary in attempt to take the throne

The following events occurred in October 1921:

== October 1, 1921 (Saturday) ==
- New York City's dockworkers and longshoremen walked out on strike after disagreeing with their union leaders over the extent of a wage cut.
- An earthquake struck near Elsinore, Utah, prompting fears of the end of the world. The quakes also rocked the towns of Richfield and Monroe.
- The city of Freital, located in the Saxony state of Germany, was created by the merger of the villages of Deuben, Potschappel and Döhlen.
- French Army Lieutenant Georges Kirsch set a new speed record, flying 300 kilometres (190 mi) in one hour, 4:39.2, averaging 279 kilometres per hour (173 mph) in winning the Coupe Deutsch de la Meurthe airplane race. Joseph Sadi-Lecointe crashed after an apparent bird strike.
- Born: James Whitmore, U.S. actor, in White Plains, New York (d. 2009)
- Died: Youlan, 37, Chinese Princess-Consort and the birth mother (in 1906) of the last Emperor of China, Puyi, committed suicide by swallowing opium.

== October 2, 1921 (Sunday) ==
- Georges Clemenceau, unveiling a war memorial in his home village, answered critics who had accused him of having sacrificed the rights of France to "the policy of alliances."
- Guatemala's legislature ratified the four-nation treaty to complete the formation of the Federation of Central America with Guatemala, Honduras and El Salvador, though Costa Rica had still not ratified. The new federation came into existence on October 10.
- While on a voyage from Fairbanks to Tolovana, Alaska, with 21 crewmen but no passengers or cargo aboard, the 495-gross register ton, U.S. 149.6-foot (45.6 m) passenger ship Tanana, a sternwheel paddle steamer, hit a submerged snag on the Tanana River 1 mile (1.6 km) above Minto. While attempting to beach, it sank in 6 feet (1.8 m) of water.
- In the Italian city of Modena, Fascists and Socialists fought on the streets during riots.
- Born: Edmund Crispin (pen name of Robert Bruce Montgomery), British crime writer and composer (d. 1978)
- Died:
  - King William II of Württemberg, 73, German ruler deposed in 1918
  - David Bispham, 65, American operatic baritone
  - Colonel Alfred Wagstaff, 78, president of the Society for Prevention of Cruelty to Animals

== October 3, 1921 (Monday) ==
- William Howard Taft, who had served as the 27th president of the United States was administered the oath of office to become the 10th Chief Justice of the United States.
- The Soviet Union's state bank, Gosbank (Gosudarstvenny bank SSSR), was created by a resolution passed by the All-Russian Central Executive Committee as part of Vladimir Lenin's New Economic Policy.
- Congolese religious leader Simon Kimbangu was sentenced to death by a military court in Leopoldville in the Belgian Congo, though the sentence would later be commuted to life imprisonment.
- Spanish troops captured Selouane in Morocco from the Moroccan Moors.
- The American newspaper comic panel Our Boarding House, created by Gene Ahern, made its debut, and would last 63 years until December 22, 1984, long after boarding houses were no longer common.
- Died:
  - Joseph Hart, 60, American vaudevillian and playwright.
  - Mohammad Taqi Pessian, 29, Iranian rebel who had led a coup in April against future prime minister Ahmad Qavam, was killed in battle by troops loyal to Qavam.

== October 4, 1921 (Tuesday) ==
- Swedish Prime Minister Oscar von Sydow and his cabinet resigned in the wake of recent parliamentary elections.
- Rioting broke out in London following a peaceful march by 10,000 unemployed people to Hyde Park, escorted by 500 policemen who controlled side traffic. At Hyde Park, parade leaders announced that the group should march through Trafalgar Square to the London County Council building, and an estimated 3,000 people proceeded on the unauthorized march. When speakers attempted to climb on the monument to Admiral Nelson, the police rushed in and charged the crowd, and rioting began.
- Born: Francisco Morales-Bermúdez, president of Peru from 1975 to 1980; in Lima. (d. 2022)
- Died: Madeline Davis, 23, an inexperienced amateur stunt flier, during an attempt to become the first woman to transfer from a moving automobile to an airplane flying overhead via a rope ladder, at Long Branch, New Jersey, United States. Davis lost her grip on the ladder and hit the ground at a speed of about 45 miles per hour (72 kilometres per hour).

== October 5, 1921 (Wednesday) ==
- The first radio broadcast of a baseball World Series game was made by Pittsburgh station KDKA and also heard on a group of other commercial and amateur stations throughout the eastern United States.
- Riccardo Zanella was inaugurated as the first, and only president of the Free State of Fiume. Fiume was created as a buffer state between territory of Italy and Yugoslavia, and now the area around the city of Rijeka on the Adriatic Sea coast of Croatia. Zanella served slightly less than five months and was forced to flee on March 3, 1922, after a Fascist rebellion.
- A train accident killed 33 people near the Saint-Lazare outside of Paris, after one suburban train struck another train ahead of it while both were inside a tunnel.
- U.S. Army General Leonard Wood was confirmed as the new Governor-General of the Philippines.
- The new Constitution of Liechtenstein was put into effect by Johann II, Prince of Liechtenstein, making the European nation a constitutional monarchy.
- The Golden Moth, with lyrics by P. G. Wodehouse and music by Ivor Novello (his first complete score), opened at the Adelphi Theatre in London's West End, starring Bobbie Comber.
- Died: John Storey, 52, Australian politician and Premier of New South Wales since 1920, died of an attack of nephritis exacerbated by his work schedule

== October 6, 1921 (Thursday) ==
- Three of the most popular songs of the year, "California, Here I Come", "April Showers" and "Toot, Toot, Tootsie (Goo' Bye!)", were introduced with the premiere of the Broadway musical Bombo at Jolson's 59th Street Theatre in New York City. The show, with music by Sigmund Romberg and lyrics by Harold Atteridge was written as a showcase starring Al Jolson, who appeared in blackface as a slave of Christopher Columbus. The show opened for the first of 218 performances, ending on April 8, 1922, before going on a national tour.

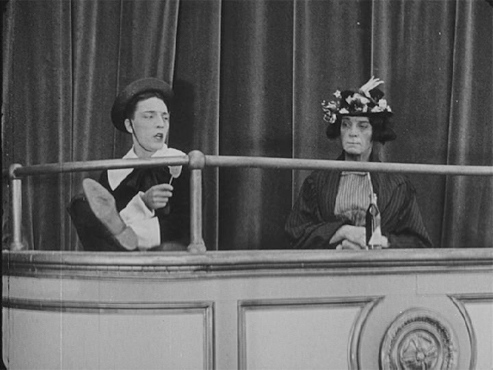
Keaton and Keaton in a scene from The Playhouse

- The Playhouse, an innovative comedy film starring Buster Keaton, premiered, using special effects devised by Keaton to portray him in multiple roles in the same scenes, including one in which he portrays the conductor and the performers in a six-piece orchestra.
- Born: Joseph Lowery, African-American civil rights leader and co-founder of the Southern Christian Leadership Conference; in Huntsville, Alabama (d. 2020)

== October 7, 1921 (Friday) ==
- The Burgenland dispute between Austria and Hungary was submitted by the League of Nations for mediation by Italy.
- China responded to Japan's demands for Shantung province (now Shandong), rejecting them completely.
- The U.S. Army tested a new type of flashless explosive powder to make night artillery invisible, and made the first public demonstration of "the world's greatest gun", the new 16-inch (410 mm) diameter cannon that could fire an artillery shell 20 miles (32 km).

== October 8, 1921 (Saturday) ==
- The British Laird Line passenger ship SS Rowan was rammed from astern by the U.S. ship West Camak in fog in the North Channel. While passengers were mustered on deck, another UK ship, Clan Malcolm, coming to aid in the rescue, rammed the Rowan from starboard, causing it to sink with the loss of 22 of the 97 people on board.
- The first live radio broadcast of an American football game took place as KDKA of Pittsburgh covered the University of Pittsburgh Panthers defeating the University of West Virginia Mountaineers, 21 to 13.
- The first "Sweetest Day" took place in the U.S. in candy shops across the United States.
- Died: Michael F. Farley, 58, former U.S. Representative for New York, died three days after contracting anthrax while shaving. Farley had nicked himself with a razor and had been using a contaminated shaving brush that infected the cut in his neck, and became progressively worse.

== October 9, 1921 (Sunday) ==
- The most popular soccer football rivalry in the Netherlands, De Klassieker, between AFC Ajax (of Amsterdam) and Feyenoord Rotterdam, the teams of the two largest Dutch cities, was played for the first time, ending in a 2 to 2 draw.
- Taras Bulba, a rhapsody by Czech composer Leoš Janáček, was performed for the first time. František Neumann conducted the premiere at the National Theatre in Brno.
- Hungary's former Ferenc József Tudományegyetem ("Franz Josef University") was inaugurated, following its move to Szeged.
- The British passenger ship SS Rowan sank within two minutes after colliding with another British ship, Clan Malcolm, and 22 of the 97 people on board died. The dead included eight members of the Southern Syncopated Orchestra, an African-American jazz band that had been touring the British Isles and had completed a performance at Glasgow two days earlier.
- The Cadle Tabernacle, a nondenominational, 10,000-seat auditorium in Indianapolis, United States, built by E. Howard Cadle, was dedicated by Rodney "Gipsy" Smith.
- The first Test match of the tour between the national cricket teams of Australia and South Africa, held in Durban, ended in a draw.

== October 10, 1921 (Monday) ==
- The Federation of Central America, composed of Honduras, Guatemala and El Salvador came into existence with a capital at Tegucigalpa in Honduras.
- The Kingdom of Kurdistan, with a capital at Sulaymaniyah in the British mandate for Iraq, was proclaimed by Sheikh Mahmud Barzanji.
- Born: Richard Black, American commercial artist and illustrator who created the advertising character "Mr. Clean" for the worldwide advertising of the cleaning product of the same name in 1958; in Philadelphia (d. 2014)

== October 11, 1921 (Tuesday) ==
- The Anglo-Irish peace talks opened in London with British Prime Minister David Lloyd George, Austen Chamberlain, Lord Birkenhead, Winston Churchill, Laming Worthington-Evans, Hamar Greenwood and Gordon Hewart for the UK, and Arthur Griffith, Michael Collins, R. C. Barton, E. J. Duggan and Gavan Duffy for Ireland.
- Born: Henry G. Marsh, one of the first African-American mayors of a city of at least 100,000 people (Saginaw, Michigan from 1967 to 1969); in Knoxville, Tennessee (d. 2011)

== October 12, 1921 (Wednesday) ==
- The League of Nations reached a decision on the division of Upper Silesia between Poland and Germany, but did not reveal the terms.
- Born: Albert Blaustein, American lawyer who assisted in the drafting of constitutions in 13 world nations; in Brooklyn (d. 1994)
- Died:
  - Philander C. Knox, 68, former U.S. Secretary of State, former U.S. Attorney General, and more recently incumbent U.S. Senator for Pennsylvania.
  - Dr. Joseph William Richards, U.S. expert on aluminum.

== October 13, 1921 (Thursday) ==
- The New York Giants (NL) defeated the New York Yankees (AL), 1 to 0, to win the 1921 World Series by 5 games to 3. The Giants had won Game 7 the day before, 2 to 1, but at the time, the Series had a "best-5-of-9" format, and the Giants' Game 8 win prevented the Yankees from forcing an unprecedented Game 9. Immediately after the championship was awarded to the Giants, Baseball Commissioner Kenesaw M. Landis announced that he would ask the club owners to change the format to a "best-4-of-7" series.
- The Treaty of Kars was signed between the Grand National Assembly of Turkey and the Soviet Socialist Republics of Armenia, Azerbaijan and Georgia, establishing the boundaries between Turkey and the states of the south Caucasus.
- Swedish Social Democratic party leader Hjalmar Branting became Prime Minister, after strong general election gains for his party.
- Born: Yves Montand, Italian-born French actor, in Monsummano Terme, as Ivo Livi (d. 1991).

== October 14, 1921 (Friday) ==
- By a margin of only four votes, the U.S. House of Representatives narrowly rejected a plan, proposed by New York Congressman Isaac Siegel, to increase its number from 435 to 460. The vote was 142 for, and 146 against, a plan to direct the House Census Committee to apportion representatives based on the 1920 U.S. Census. A second plan, offered by Massachusetts Representative George H. Tinkham, would have reduced the number of House members from 435 to 425, with the number would have been based on the number of registered voters in a state rather than its population, with the intent as a deterrent to the disenfranchisement of African-American voters in the South. By voice vote, the Tinkham plan (which would have taken 33 seats away from Southern states with literacy tests and poll taxes), was overwhelmingly rejected as well.
- The lives of all 8 of the crew of the U.S. schooner Maplefield were saved when a freighter, the United Fruit company transport, the Ulua, spotted the distressed vessel while in a heavy storm about 60 miles (97 km) from Pensacola, Florida. According to the crew of the Maplefield, which was staying afloat partly because of its cargo of lumber, the schooner had been drifting out of control for 48 hours in a gale, and had been hours away from striking rocks and sinking.

== October 15, 1921 (Saturday) ==
- Railroad workers across the United States were ordered by the leaders of the Brotherhood of Railroad Trainmen, Brotherhood of Locomotive Firemen and Enginemen, the Order of Railway Conductors, the Brotherhood of Locomotive Engineers and the Switchmen's Union of North America, to go on strike effective 6:00 in the morning local time on October 30, when the first 750,000 of two million were to walk off the job, followed by 1,250,000 in November.
- Compañía Española de Tráfico Aéreo, based in Seville, launched the first air service between Spain and Morocco. The company would later become part of the Iberia airline.
- The U.S. Unemployment Conference ended.
- Born: Brajraj Mahapatra, Indian prince who ruled the Tigiria State from 1943 to 1947, and the last surviving Indian monarch; in Tigiria (d. 2015)

== October 16, 1921 (Sunday) ==
- Babe Ruth, the highest-paid baseball player in the world, defied a threat of suspension by Baseball Commissioner Kenesaw M. Landis, by appearing in an unauthorized exhibition baseball game in Buffalo, New York against the "Polish Nationals of Buffalo", along with fellow New York Yankees Bob Meusel and Bill Piercy. Two other teammates, Carl Mays and Wally Schang, withdrew from the contest after Landis had issued his order, and Buffalo's minor league baseball park, used by the International League, changed plans to host the game. Ruth hit one home run in the game and his team won, 4 to 2.

== October 17, 1921 (Monday) ==
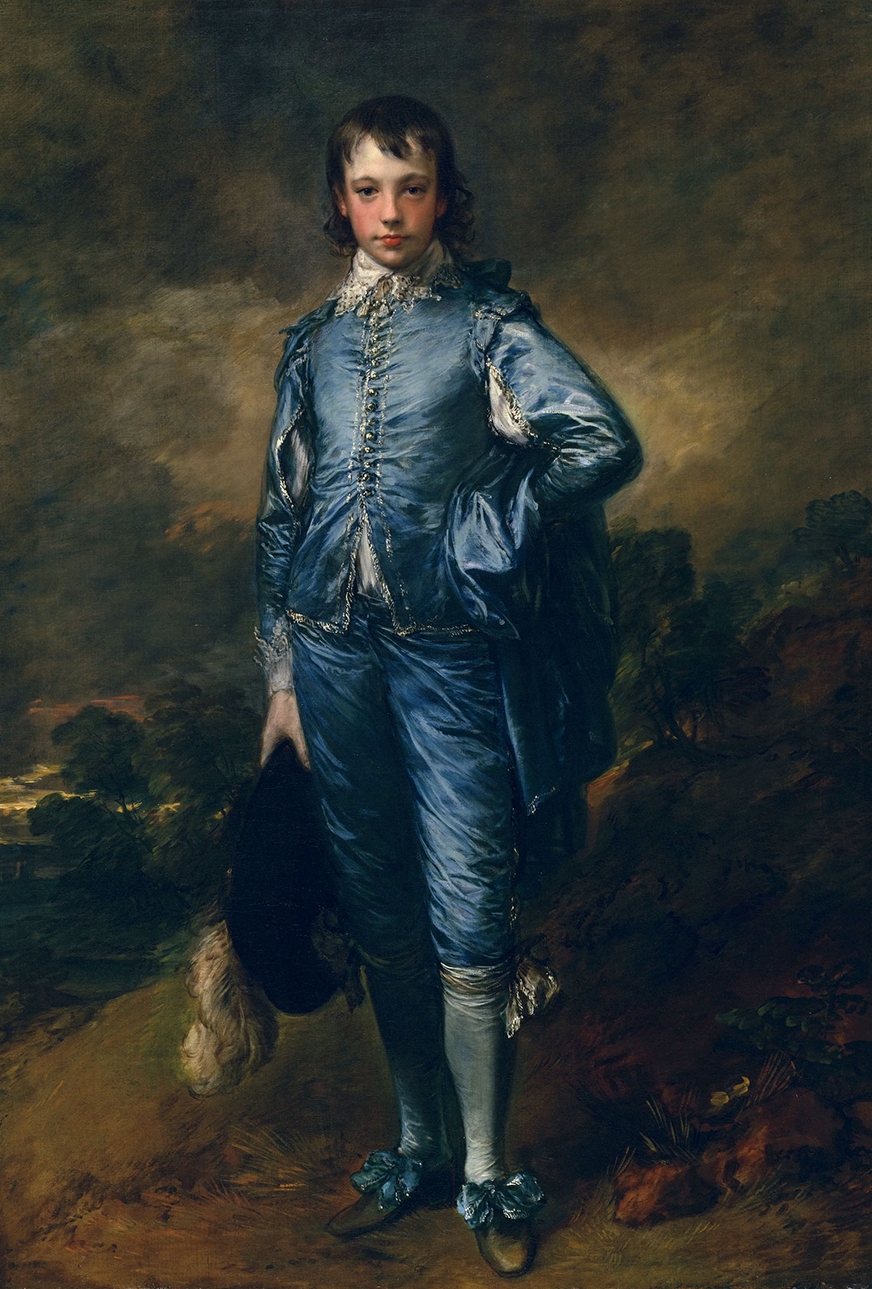
The Blue Boy

- The Blue Boy, the most famous of the paintings of British artist Thomas Gainsborough, was sold at auction to an American art dealer, Joseph Duveen, by the Duke of Westminster. The Daily Telegraph of London commented that "We have seen too much in these stressful times of that rigorous code of national taxation which has shaken the foundations of private ownership in inherited lands and treasures. Some relief may be derived from the fact that it is the generous wont of American millionaires to leave their spoils of European art treasures to public galleries." Duveen bid £170,000 (roughly $809,000 at the exchange rate then of $4.76 to a British Pound, and equivalent to $12,030,000 in 2021). He also bought the Joshua Reynolds painting Sarah Siddons as the Tragic Muse for an additional £30,000 after the Duke of Westminster had declined to sell The Blue Boy by itself for £150,000.
- The U.S. Congress voted to bestow the Medal of Honor to the unidentified British Army soldier who had been interred near London in The Tomb of The Unknown Warrior. King George V announced in a message to General John J. Pershing that the Unknown Soldier selected by the U.S. would receive Britain's highest award, the Victoria Cross, on Armistice Day.
- Brazil's president Epitácio Pessoa addressed the Brazilian Congress on the subject of the crisis in the coffee industry and proposed new measures to protect Brazilian producers.
- Born: George Mackay Brown, Scottish poet and author, in Stromness, Orkney (d. 1996
- Died: Yaa Asantewaa, 81, former Ashanti queen and military leader who led the War of the Golden Stool against British colonial forces in 1900.

== October 18, 1921 (Tuesday) ==
- The U.S. Senate ratified the peace treaties with Germany, Austria and Hungary, by a vote of 66 to 20.
- German Chancellor Joseph Wirth and his cabinet resigned, one day after the value of the German mark plunged by 25% on the currency exchange At the same time, prices soared in Germany and a panic ensued in economic crisis, blamed on the loss of part of Upper Silesia to Poland. Germany's president, Friedrich Ebert asked Dr. Wirth to form a new government that would retain Walther Rathenau as Minister of Reconstruction.
- Esteban Gil Borges resigned as Foreign Minister of Venezuela so that he could move to the United States to take up the practice of law.
- The Taurida Governorate was disestablished and the Crimean Autonomous Soviet Socialist Republic was created within the Russian Soviet Federative Socialist Republic.
- Charles P. Strite was awarded U.S. Patent No. 1,394,450 for his invention, "Bread-toaster with automatic bread ejection", the pop-up toaster.
- Died: King Ludwig III of Bavaria, 76, German ruler deposed in 1918

== October 19, 1921 (Wednesday) ==
- The Prime Minister of Portugal was assassinated along with the Republic's founder and first president, and other members of the government, by rioters in Lisbon angry over the abolition of the monarchy of Portugal. Prime Minister António Granjo and former president António Machado Santos were murdered after their residences were breached. Two former officials, Navy Minister José Carlos da Maia was killed as well. General Manuel Maria Coelho was sworn in later in the evening as the fifth person to serve as Prime Minister in 1921.
- A packaged explosive, in the form of wrapped mail delivery containing a "Mills bomb" — a British-made fragmentation hand grenade — was delivered to the office of the U.S. Ambassador to France, Myron T. Herrick. Because of a busy schedule, Herrick was delayed in opening the registered delivery, marked "personal", and took it to his home. Herrick's valet, British Army veteran Lawrence Blanchard, avoided being killed after loosening the wrapping of the package at Herrick's home, because he recognized the sound of a spring and whirring characteristic of the grenade. Blanchard had the presence of mind to throw the package into an empty room, but still caught a piece of shrapnel in his leg.
- Born: Gunnar Nordahl, Swedish footballer and manager, in Hörnefors (d. 1993)

== October 20, 1921 (Thursday) ==
- Charles, the last Emperor of Austria-Hungary, arrived in Hungary on an airplane flight from Switzerland in an attempted coup d'état. Charles, who had been Emperor Karl I of Austria and King Karoly IV of Hungary within the dual monarchy, landed in western Hungary near Sopron (formerly Ödenburg) with former Empress Zita, met up with Hungarian Army troops who were still loyal to the monarchy, and then advanced to the city of Szombathely (formerly Steinamanger).
- The Allied Powers notified Germany and Poland of their decision on the division of Upper Silesia.
- The U.S. cargo ship Santa Rita departed New Orleans, Louisiana, for Italy, and was lost with all hands. It was last seen off of the coast of Key West, Florida.

== October 21, 1921 (Friday) ==
- The Kingdom of Montenegro was formally dissolved as the widow of King Nicholas, Queen Consort Milena, declined to continue a government. The decision paved the way for Montenegro to become part of the Kingdom of Yugoslavia, pursuant to an agreement made on November 26, 1918.
- The Communist University of the Toilers of the East (Kommunisticheskiy universitet trudyashchikhsya Vostoka KUTV) created by Communist International, was opened in Moscow to train Communist independence leaders in Asia.
- Shortly after the start of the peace conference between Ireland and the United Kingdom in London, the German police, tipped off by a British liaison officer, discovered a ship laden with weapons in the port of Hamburg, bound for Ireland.
- George Melford's silent film The Sheik, based on the novel by Edith Maude Hull and starring Rudolph Valentino, premièred in Los Angeles.
- Born:
  - Dr. Victor A. McKusick, American geneticist and pioneer in the human genome project; in Parkman, Maine (d. 2008)
  - Mohammad Mohammadullah, president of Bangladesh, in Raipur, British India (d. 1999)
  - Malcolm Arnold, English composer, in Northampton (d. 2006)

== October 22, 1921 (Saturday) ==
- Germany's cabinet resigned after the League of Nations announced its decision to award part of Silesia to Poland.
- The League of Nations announced an agreement between the 10 major members of the League declaring the Åland Islands, recently awarded to Finland, neutral.
- Assassins in Bulgaria shot and killed Alexander Dimitrov, the kingdom's Minister of War, along with his chauffeur and two other passengers in an attack on his automobile in an ambush near Kyustendil, a resort town southwest of Sofia.
- Born: Georges Brassens, French singer-songwriter, in Sète (d. 1981)

== October 23, 1921 (Sunday) ==
- Roughly 350,000 union members among railroad clerks, freight handlers, express employees and station employees voted against the proposed October 30 strike by the "Big Five" labor unions.
- Former Austro-Hungarian Emperor Charles I, seeking to reclaim the throne of Hungary, arrived with his troops within five miles (8 km) of the capital at Budapest, and some dispatches reported that he had overthrown the regency of Admiral Miklos Horthy.
- A Category 4 hurricane swept into Florida's Tampa Bay, killing at least eight people and causing $10 million of damage (equivalent to $145 million in 2021).
- Born: Denise Duval, French operatic soprano, in Paris (d. 2016)

== October 24, 1921 (Monday) ==
- The coup attempt by former King Károly of Hungary was put down by the Regent, Admiral Miklós Horthy. Károly, the former Emperor Charles I of Austria-Hungary, was placed under arrest along with his wife Zita after being caught by government troops near the village of Tata and interned at an abbey in Tihany and would eventually be sent back into exile on the Portuguese island of Madeira.
- In a ceremony in the French city of Châlons-en-Champagne, the unidentified soldier to be interred in the United States Tomb of the Unknown Soldier at Arlington National Cemetery was selected from four possible persons. U.S. Army Sergeant Edward F. Younger, who had been awarded the Distinguished Service Cross for valor during World War One, was tasked with picking from four identical caskets, and placed flowers on the third from the left.
- Elections were held in Norway for the 150 seats of the unicameral Storting. The coalition between the liberal Frisinnede Venstre party of Prime Minister Otto Blehr and the conservative Høyre party of former premier Otto B. Halvorsen, retained control with 57 seats.
- U.S. Treasury Secretary Andrew Mellon announced new regulations concerning physician prescription of alcohol. Doctors could prescribe up to 2½ gallons of beer or two quarts of wine for medicinal purposes for as often as necessary, but whiskey and other alcohol were limited to one pint, no more often than every 10 days. The action came at the same time that the U.S. Senate was considering a bill, passed by the House of Representatives in August, to prohibit beer from being prescribed as a medicine.
- Gerald Chapman, George "Dutch" Anderson, and Charles Loeber stopped a United States Post Office truck in New York City and robbed it of $2,400,000 in cash, negotiable bonds and jewelry, equivalent to $38,000,000 a century later. The three eluded capture and their identities would remain undiscovered for more than eight months until their arrest by U.S. postal inspectors on July 3, 1922. Loeber cooperated with prosecutors in testifying against his partners in crime and received immunity. Chapman and Anderson would both be sentenced to 25 years incarceration in the U.S. Penitentiary in Atlanta, and both would escape, with Anderson dying in a gunbattle in 1925 and Chapman executed in the electric chair in 1926 for the 1924 murder of a police officer.

== October 25, 1921 (Tuesday) ==
- Chester W. Taylor was elected as a U.S. Representative from Arkansas, in place of his father, Samuel Mitchell Taylor, who had died a month earlier.
- Engineer Hugo Abt filed a patent in the U.S. for a new design of bascule bridge.
- Born: King Michael I of Romania, at Foișor Castle, Sinaia (d. 2017)
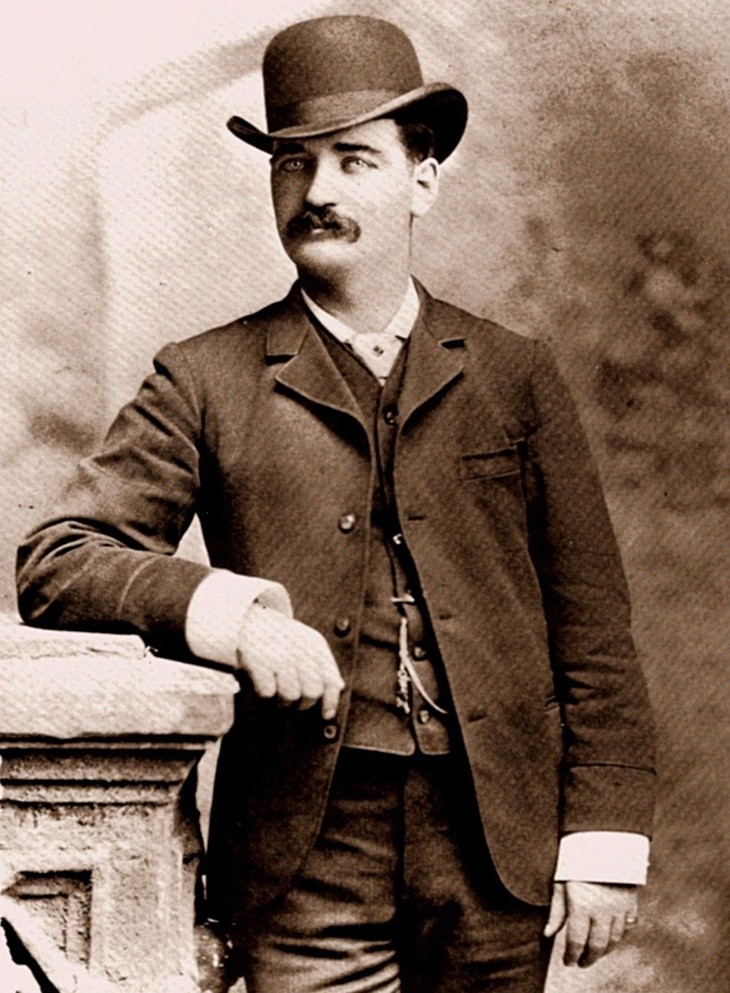
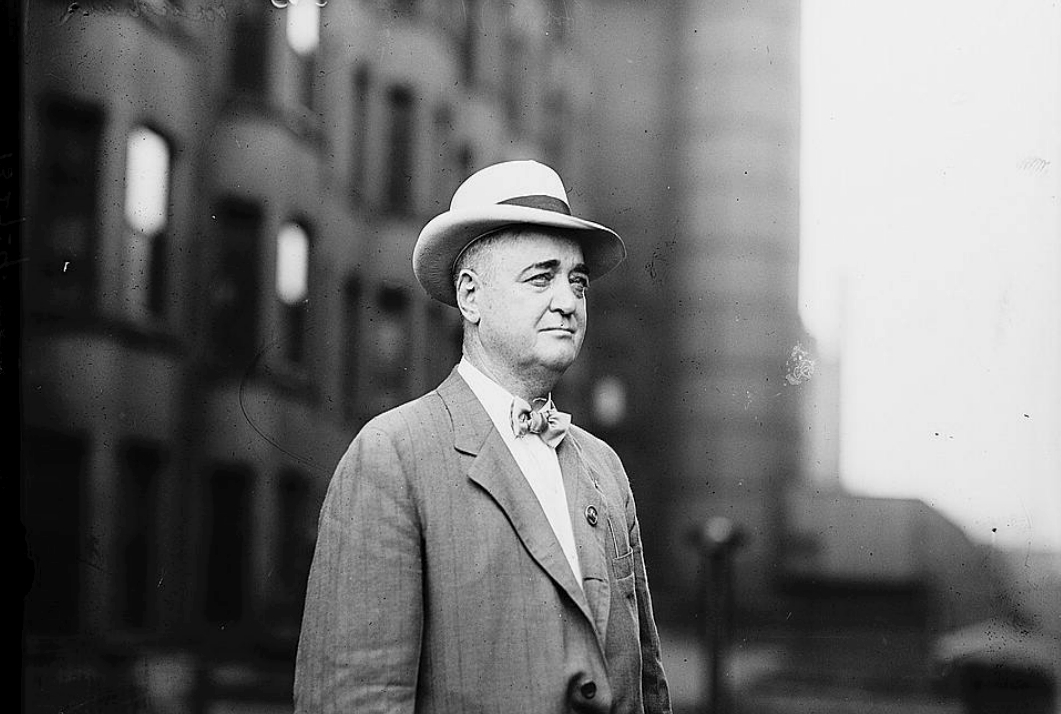
Bat Masterson at 23 and at 67
- Died: William Barclay "Bat" Masterson, 67, U.S. gunfighter, former Sheriff (in Dodge City) of Ford County, Kansas and journalist, of a heart attack while working at his desk on a column for the New York Morning Telegraph.

== October 26, 1921 (Wednesday) ==
- French Prime Minister Aristide Briand received a vote of confidence in the Chamber of Deputies, 338 to 172, days before his scheduled October 29 departure to the United States to represent France at the Washington Disarmament Conference.
- German Chancellor Joseph Wirth formed a new cabinet and received a 232 to 132 vote of confidence from the Reichstag.
- Edward, Prince of Wales, left the UK for an eight-month tour of India and Japan. The future King Edward VIII boarded the Royal Navy battle cruiser HMS Renown at Portsmouth on a voyage to Bombay (now Mumbai). The crew of Renown included as a midshipman Prince Charles, Count of Flanders, the second son of King Albert I of Belgium.
- The Chicago Theatre, now the oldest surviving grand movie palace in the United States, opened with The Sign on the Door, starring Norma Talmadge and Lew Cody.
- U.S. president Warren G. Harding spoke at the 50th anniversary of the founding of Birmingham, Alabama, to an audience of black and white residents, declaring that there must be equality between the races in "political and economic life" but that the black and white needed to remain segregated. U.S. Senator Pat Harrison of Mississippi said later, "The President's speech was unfortunate... Of course, every rational being desires to see the negro protected in his life, liberty and property. I believe in giving him every right under the law to which he is entitled, but to encourage the negro... to strive through every political avenue to be placed upon equality with the whites, is a blow to the whole white civilization of this country that will take years to combat." Harrison added, "If the President's theory... that the black person, either man or woman, should have full economic and political rights with the white man or white woman, then that means that the black man can strive to become President of the United States... It means white women should work under black men in public places, as well as in all trades and professions... Place the negro upon political and economic equality with the white man or woman and the friction between the races will be aggravated."
- Born: Frances Scott Fitzgerald, American journalist, to novelists F. Scott Fitzgerald and Zelda Fitzgerald (d. 1986)

== October 27, 1921 (Thursday) ==
- Less than 72 hours before U.S. railroad employees were scheduled to go on a nationwide strike, the executive committee of the "Big Five" transportation unions (for engineers, trainmen, firemen, conductors, and switchmen) met at the Hotel Morrison in Chicago and, after a four-hour conference that ended at 11:30 at night, announced that the strike was called off. Speaking for the committee, L. E. Sheppard of the Order of Railway Conductors said that the unions had backed down "due to the growing public opinion that the strike would be against the Labor Board, and consequently the Government, and not against the railroads." Sheppard added "We called this strike to gain certain rights to which our men were entitled. It soon became evident, however, that the roads were succeeding in their misleading propaganda to the effect that we really would be striking against the Government."

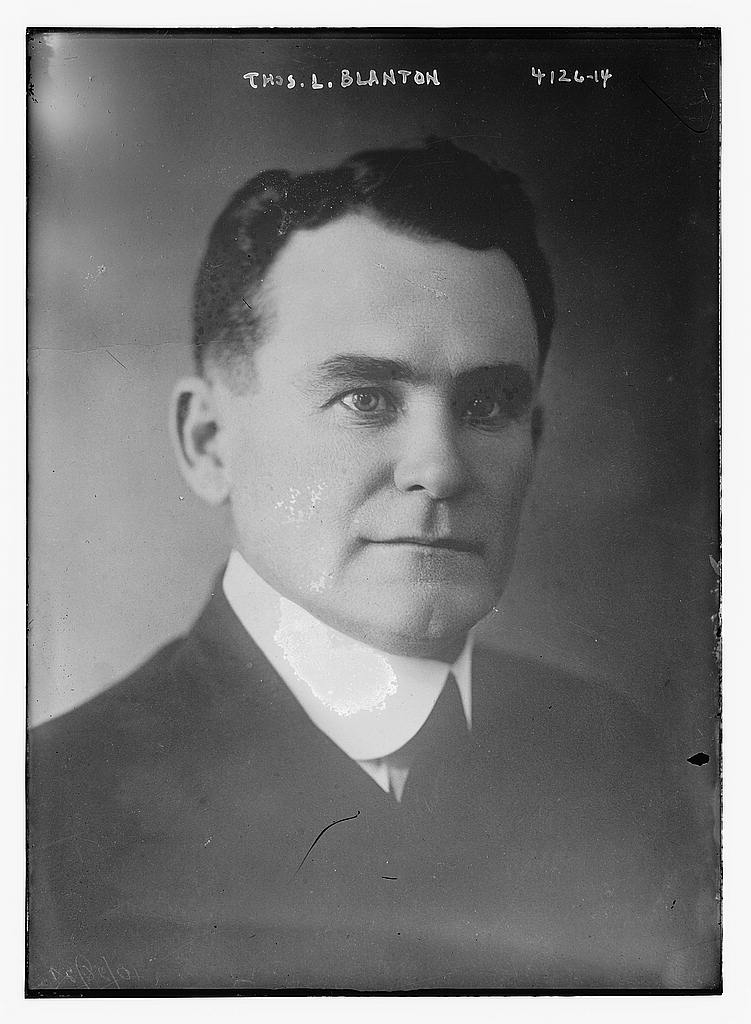
Congressman Blanton

- U.S. Representative Thomas L. Blanton of Texas was unanimously censured by the House of Representatives for reading "unspeakable, vile, foul, filthy, profane, blasphemous and obscene" language into the Congressional Record. The language was partially redacted by the Government Printing Office, but easy to figure out, as "G__d D___n your black heart, you ought to have it torn out of you, you u____ s_____ of a b_____. You and the Public Printer has no sense. You k_____ his a____ and he is a d_____d fool for letting you do it." After the vote of censure, a motion to expel Blanton from Congress was 203 in favor and 113 against, falling eight votes short of the required two-thirds majority for expulsion.
- Following the example of the Chamber of Deputies, the French Senate voted its confidence in Prime Minister Aristide Briand by a margin of 301 to 29, on the eve of his departure for the Washington Disarmament Conference.
- Poland and Germany both announced their acceptance of the division of Upper Silesia made by the League of Nations.
- Died: Yan Fu, 67, Chinese scholar and translator.

== October 28, 1921 (Friday) ==
- The first ever gubernatorial recall election in the U.S. was held in North Dakota, United States, after the incumbent, Lynn Frazier, was blamed for an economic depression in the agricultural sector. Frazier, who had won election as a candidate of the Non-Partisan League, was recalled from office before completing his term in a vote that not only determined whether he would continue in office, but that elected his replacement, Ragnvald A. Nestos. Frazier lost to Nestos by a margin of about 97,000 votes to 106,000. Frazier would be elected U.S. Senator for North Dakota a year later.
- At least 35 people drowned in Canada in the town of Britannia Beach, British Columbia, after floods swept away fifty houses into the Howe Sound.
- The body of an unidentified Italian Army soldier, killed in World War One, was selected from among 11 sets of remains to be interred in Italy's Tomb of the Unknown Soldier (Tomba del Milite Ignoto).
- Anti-bolshevik forces in Anadyr declared Chukotka independent as the Free State of Chukotka before Soviet forces retook the town in April the next year.
- Died: Ahmed Raza Khan Barelvi ("Ala-Hazrat"), 65, British Indian Islamic scholar.

== October 29, 1921 (Saturday) ==
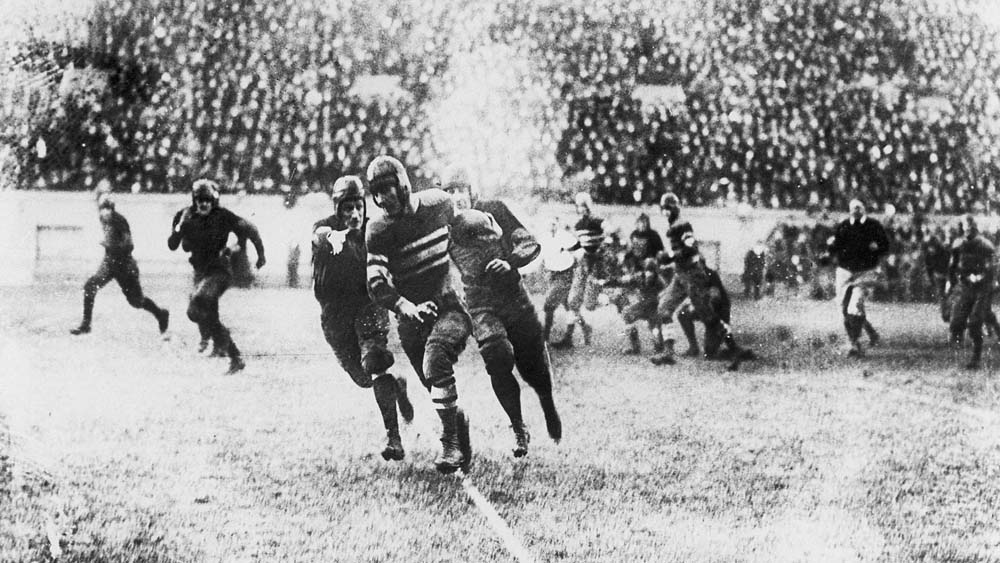
McMillin scoring for Centre against Harvard

- In one of the most surprising upsets in American college football, visiting Centre College of Danville, Kentucky, led by quarterback Bo McMillin, handed a 6 to 0 loss to Harvard University, which had not lost a game in almost three years. McMillin ran 32 yards for a touchdown for the game's only score. The match became known as "football's upset of the century."
- Construction of the Link River Dam, a stage in the Klamath Project in Oregon, United States, was completed.
- The government of the Soviet Union announced that it would recognize its obligation to pay most of the Imperial Russian government's debts incurred prior to World War One.
- Rabbi Joseph Saul Kornfeld of Columbus, Ohio, was appointed as the U.S. Minister to Persia.
- Born: Bill Mauldin, American cartoonist (d. 2003)

== October 30, 1921 (Sunday) ==
- Voting was conducted in the republics of Guatemala, Honduras and El Salvador to elect a Congress for the newly created Federation of Central America, with members scheduled to take office on January 15.
- France ratified its treaty of peace and economic cooperation with the Turkish Republic.
- Argentina won the 1921 South American Championship soccer football tournament.

== October 31, 1921 (Monday) ==
- The International Women's Sports Federation (Fédération Sportive Féminine Internationale or FSFI) was founded in Paris at a convention attended by delegates from France, the UK, the U.S., Italy and Czechoslovakia and organised by Alice Milliat of France after the International Olympic Committee had refused to include track and field events for women in the 1924 Olympics.
- The British House of Commons voted its approval of Prime Minister David Lloyd George and his government's policy toward Ireland, 439 to 43.
- The Mauritius-registered ship Dersingham, travelling from Singapore to Port Louis, was in communication for the last time. It was subsequently presumed to have foundered in the Indian Ocean with the loss of all on board.
- Died: William Egan, 37, American gangster, was killed in a drive-by shooting in front of a tavern that he owned, prompting a war between organized crime gangs in St. Louis.
