= SS Rowan =

Coordinates: 55.014°N 5.305°W

History
- Owner: Laird Line Ltd.
- Builder: D. & W. Henderson & Co. Ltd.
- Yard number: 467
- Launched: 23 April 1909
- Identification: Official number: 128288
- Fate: Sunk in collision 9 October 1921

General characteristics
- Tonnage: 1,493 GRT
- Length: 85.6 m (281 ft)
- Beam: 11.6 m (38 ft)
- Draft: 4.9 m (16 ft)
- Installed power: Triple expansion steam engine; 4 × boilers; 525 hp (391 kW)
- Propulsion: Single screw
- Speed: 16 knots (30 km/h; 18 mph)

SS Rowan was a British passenger steamer of the Laird Line which was sunk off Corsewall Point on the west coast of Scotland on 9 October 1921.

== Sinking ==
Rowan left Clydebank for Derry, in Ireland, early in the afternoon on 8 October 1921, by arrangement waiting at Greenock to take on the members of the Southern Syncopated Orchestra, a jazz band who had been performing in Glasgow. At approximately 12.15AM, in dense fog, Rowan was following the coast of Scotland southwards when she was rammed in the stern by the northward-bound American steamer West Camak in the North Channel. The passengers were mustered on deck and had put on lifejackets, when the British steamer Clan Malcolm, coming to the rescue, rammed her from starboard and cut her in two. Rowan sank within two minutes with the loss of 22 of the 97 people on board, including eight members of the jazz ensemble. Survivors were rescued by Clan Malcolm, West Camak, and the Royal Navy destroyer HMS Wrestler.
