= New York World Exposé of the Ku Klux Klan =

20th century journalistic investigation

Ku Klux Klan: Its Origin, Rapid Growth and Secret Purposes Exposed (New York World, September 1921)

The New York World's exposé of the Ku Klux Klan brought national media to the operations and actions of the Ku Klux Klan beginning on September 6, 1921. The newspaper published a series of twenty one consecutive daily articles, edited by Herbert Bayard Swope, that discussed numerous aspects of Ku Klux Klan including rituals, recruitment methods, propaganda, and hypocrisies in logic. At least eighteen other newspapers nationwide picked up the coverage, which led to national discourse on the activities of the group. These publications included the St. Louis Post-Dispatch, Boston Globe, Pittsburgh Sun, The Plain Dealer (Cleveland), New Orleans Times-Picayune, Galveston News, Houston Chronicle, Seattle Times, Milwaukee Journal, Minneapolis Journal, Oklahoma City Oklahoman, Toledo Blade, Fort Wayne News-Sentinel, Syracuse Herald, Columbus Enquirer-Sun and the Albany Knickerbocker Press. The New York Times ran ads for the article series to increase exposure, while other large papers like the Baltimore Sun quickly picked up the article series instead of advertising for The World. The Ku Klux Klan announced shortly afterward that it would take legal action against all the publications that ran the article series for libel, seeking total damages of over $10 million. Following the exposé, Klan membership significantly increased.According to the Columbia Journalism Review, "The series drew two million readers nationwide. New Yorkers stood in line for copies. And the Justice Department and several congressmen promised to investigate the group."

== September 6, 1921 ==
The first article was titled "Ku Klux Klan Wars on Catholics, Jews; Reap Rich Returns" – "Nationwide Investigation of Secret Order Shows It Gains Great Power by Winning Officials as Members – Fortune is Collected in Initiation Dues". The first article posed many questions to draw in readers regarding how the Klan works, and offered that it would explain all in its series. It expounded on the increase in membership past 500,000 in recent years, and it described an expanded interest from being anti-African American to being an anti-Catholic, and anti-Jewish group as well. The Klan accomplished this by barring membership to these groups. It also reveals that the Klan used salesmen, called Kleagles, to try to recruit members that require $10 donations, $4 of which goes to the Kleagle, and the rest to the organization. It estimates that at the time, the Klan had raised over five million dollars, all to support the 'invisible empire'. The article condemns acts committed by the Klan used by these funds on moral grounds, and explains that its series will tell all that it could find after months of investigation.

== September 7, 1921 ==
The second article was titled "Ku Klux Officer Exposes Alleged Frauds of Order" – "Captain Fry Voluntarily Resign Positions, Denounces Organization as 'Un-American, Conceived in Avarice, Sired in Ignorance, and Damned in Greed'." The article focused on a resignation letter written to the Klan by a former Kleagle, Henry P. Fry, condemning the Klan due to conflict with their activities on moral grounds and the Klan's oath's conflict with his oath to the United States Army.

== September 8, 1921 ==
The third article was titled "Ku Klux Klan Plot Alleged to Reach Army and Navy" – "Officers Club in New York Used for Mail Headquarters for Membership Solicitors – Men in Service Invited to Join Secret Order." The article focused on correspondence among the Klan and members of the Army and Navy Club in New York City through a semi-secret mailbox (an abnormality for mail at the club) to recruit potential prospects in the armed services. The Klan used its message of one hundred percent Americanism to draw in individuals in the military.

== September 9, 1921 ==
The fourth article was titled "Clarkes' Own Roster Shows 'Kleagles' In Nearly All States" – "Letter Sent Simmons by His Chief Aide Declared That Secrets of Order Were Safe from Exposure" The article discusses the sales management aspects of the Klan through using Kleages as door to door salesmen. It discusses how the Klan believed their headquarters in each area that they recruited in was secret at the time, and that individuals would be hard pressed to find them. The World was able to obtain information on all the Klan's employees, totaling over 214 members within their sales operations.

== September 10, 1921 ==
The fifth article was titled "Simmons Gives Klan Ritual to 'Aliens' by Copyright Kloran" – "Wizardry 'Colonel' Displays in Guarding Treasure of Order Surpasses All for Sheer Clumsiness." The article discusses the promotion of the Klan as an extremely secret society to potential members, so much that Klan members don't tell their closest relationships of their membership. It discusses the ritual oaths of the Kloran, which once guarded as secret were provided by Joseph Simmons with his decision to copyright the Kloran. This made the book available for reading at the Library of Congress.

== September 11, 1921 ==
The sixth article was titled "Klux Klan Ritual Indicates Simmons Indulges in Poetry" – "Imperial Wizard Adopts Holland's Familiar Lines and Overlooks Crediting to Author Long Gone." The article discusses part of the poems used within Klan rituals as well as prayers and statements during the rituals that exalt and praise the Imperial Wizard. The article reveals that Simmons stole most of a poem by a New York City poet Josiah Gilbert Holland for one section of the Kloran.

== September 12, 1921 ==
The seventh article was titled "Christian Baptism Ceremony Parodied in Klux Klan Ritual" – "Initiation Made Imposing to Impress Credulous Candidates Who Join Imperial Wizard Simmons' Hordes." The article describes the similarities of Christian Baptism that was performed in initiation ceremonies for the Klan. Initiates were interrogated about their allegiances and asked some hypothetical questions regarding their allegiance, then doused in water similar to a Baptism. During this part of the ritual, the initiators proclaimed, "With this transparent, life-giving, powerful, God-given fluid, more precious and far more significant than all the sacred oils of the ancients, I set you apparent from the men of your daily association in the great and honorable task you have voluntarily allotted yourselves as citizens of the Invisible Empire, Knights of the Ku Klux Klan." The article also gives excerpts from dedication rituals involved in the initiation process.

== September 13, 1921 ==
The eighth article was titled "Klan's Dire Crusade to Mean Fireworks, Klux Emperor Hints" – "Invisible Terror's Campaign Against Enemies Will Come When Time is Ripe, Wizard Declares." The article describes how according to Joseph Simmons, the Klan at the time was still in an organizing mode, waiting until it had gained enough membership before it participated in "fireworks". The author gives examples of quotes downplaying the Klan as a fraternal order, committed to 100 percent Americanism, using vague statements.

== September 14, 1921 ==
The ninth article was titled "Bogus K.C. Oath Used by Klux Klan Kleagle 'Among Certain Few'" – "Exposure of Fraud Follows Publication of Letters Written by Klux Official – Falsity of Claim Proved by Masonic Investigators." The article focuses on pamphlet literature handed out by Kleagles to try to convince new members to join. One pamphlet included an example of a Knights of Columbus oath that was forged by the Klan. The oath includes anti-Protestant sentiments including, "when opportunity presents, make and wage relentless war, openly and secretly, against all heretics, Protestants and Masons…" (sept 14th pg. 4). The oath was presented as an oath taken to become a 4th degree Knight of Columbus as an example to pitch the idea that Catholics were looking to eradicate Protestants and therefore should join the Klan.

== September 15, 1921 ==
The tenth article was titled "Bitter Anti-Catholic Propaganda Peddled by Officials of Klan" – "Methods More Secretive than Formerly Used by A.P.A., Is Claim – Publication Supposed to be Allied to Order, Attacks Roman Catholic." The article focuses on more anti-Catholic propaganda by the Klan. The article mentions a card distributed by the Klan called "Do You Know?" that gave false information about the activities of the Catholic Church. These included statements about the Pope controlling the media, court systems, denouncing popular government, and installing his own Catholic government.

== September 16, 1921 ==
The eleventh article was titled "Ku Klux Made Jews and Negroes Target For Racial Hatreds" – "Not all of 'Colonel' Simmons' Warfare was Directed Against Americans Who are Catholics for He Sought 'White Supremacy'."

== September 17, 1921 ==
The twelfth article was titled "Ku Klux Klan Oath So Stiff, Startles 'Hardened Joiners'" – "One Section Endorses Principle of Secret Mob Rule, Another Requires Implicit Obedience to Unknown Constitution and Regulations and Obligation is Sealed in Open Lodge with Blood of Candidate."

== September 18, 1921 ==
The thirteenth article was titled "Texas Newspapers Get Klan Command to Publish Letter" – "Lawless Ku Klux Spirit Evident in Outrages Credited to Organization – Supra-Legal Powers are Arrogated as Law is Ignored and Administration of Justice is Assumed by Men Who Hide Faces Behind Masks."

== September 19, 1921 ==
The fourteenth article was titled "Wholesale Outrages Attributed to Texas and Klux Klans" – "Members of Institution, Who Substitute Terrorism for Law, Kidnap, Beat, Tar and Feather Victims, Then Turn Them Loose on Other Communities – Long List of Attacks in Lone Star State."

== September 20, 1921 ==
The fifteenth article was titled "Ku Klux Klan Spirit Revived by Simmons is Law Unto Itself" – "Congress Was Forced to Stop Original Order Because of Outrages it Practiced After Men Who Formed it For Lawful Purposes Had Lost Control – What Charter Members and Noted Texan Say of Society."

== September 21, 1921 ==
The sixteenth article was titled "Federal, State, City Officials Are Giving Protection to Klan" – "Imperial Wizard Boasts Congressman Belong to Organization and Official Publication Shows Prosecuting Attorneys, Judges, Police Chiefs and Other Peace Officers are Members of Secret Order."

== September 22, 1921 ==
The seventeenth article was titled "Masonry Race Riots and Film Propaganda Used by Ku Klux Klan" – "Adroit Sales Wrinkles, Catch-Penny Mysteries, Snake Oil Advertisements Adopted by Officials to Increase Membership and Further Schemes of Organization – Publicity Eagerly Sought Despite Claims of Secrecy."

== September 23, 1921 ==
The eighteenth article was titled "Knights of Air Fail to Induce Pershing to Become Member" – "General Menoher 'Called' Klan for Unauthorized Use of Name – Postcard Sent to Army Men Seeking Joiners, World Charges Simmons Offered Advertising for Agreement to Shield Order's Secrets."

== September 24, 1921 ==
The nineteenth article was titled "Talking in Millions. Klan Chief Gathers in Golden Shekels" – "Singing Hymn of Hate, Klux Becomes Enormous Revenue-Producing Business Enterprise Through Methods Adopted by Imperial Kleagle Clarke, Who, With Simmons and Mrs. Tyler form K.K.K. 'big three'."

== September 25, 1921 ==
The twentieth article was titled "Col. Simmons Made Close Organization of Ku Klux Society" – "Imperial Wizard and Six Hand-Picked Members of Executive Committee are in Supreme Authority – Many Fields are Undeveloped and Additional Degrees may be Added – Uniforms Big Source of Profit."

== September 26, 1921 ==
The twenty first article was titled "Klan's Big Three Dominant Figures in Klux Movement" – "Records of Trio Indicate Wide Range of Activities."
