= Norway and the Soviet Republic of Russia Preliminary Agreement (1921) =

1921 treaty between Soviet Russia and Norway

An agreement concluded between the Soviet and the Norwegian governments in Christiania on 2 September 1921 to regulate their relations. It was ratified by the Soviet government on 19 September and by the Norwegian government on 1 October. The agreement went into effect on 1 October 1921 and was registered in League of Nations Treaty Series on 19 December 1921.

== Background ==
Following the October Revolution, the newly established communist government lacked any diplomatic recognition from other governments, since they all still hoped for the return of the old Tsarist government, or a milder version of it. The new government's first mission in the diplomatic field was to get the country out of the First World War then raging, and this was achieved in the Peace Treaty of Brest Litovsk, signed with the German Reich and its allies on 3 March 1918, which was also the first international treaty signed by the Soviet state. Following the end of the First World War, the Soviet state found itself in multi frontal war with most of its territorial neighbours, a war which came to a gradual end in 1920–1921. The end of the foreign war also led to a gradual process of diplomatic recognition of the Soviet state. The Norwegian government refused to establish diplomatic relations with Soviet Russia at this point, but agreed to a temporary arrangement to allow the operation of diplomatic representatives until such relations were established.

== Terms of the agreement ==
The preamble to the agreement stated clearly the hope for "re-establishment of normal diplomatic relations". In article 1 the Norwegian and the Soviet governments agreed to grant each other the permission to station 20 diplomatic representatives of each party in the other country. Article 2 provided that the said above diplomatic representatives shall enjoy full diplomatic immunity. Article 3 provided that the diplomatic delegations shall have full legal powers in the court system of the country they are stationed in. Article 4 provided that both governments shall respect the inviolability of each party's property in the other country. Article 5 granted the diplomatic delegations the right to issue passports to their nationals in the other country. Article 6 defined the rules of confidence in communications between each diplomatic delegation and its government. Article 7 obliged each of the signatory governments to recognize legal documents issued by the other party. Article 8 prohibited the diplomatic delegations to interfere in internal matters of the host country. Article 9 required equal treatment of Russian and Norwegian merchant ships when visiting the ports of the other party. In article 10 both governments agreed to reestablish postal and telegraph communications between the two countries. In article 11 the Norwegian government granted the Soviet government total monopoly on trade with Soviet Russia, i.e. excluded any deals with private Russian businesses. Article 12 recognized the right of nationals from both countries to make claims of restitution or compensations. Article 13 stipulated the agreement becomes effective after being ratified by both governments. It provided for renunciation by either party after a six months' notice. Article 14 established rules for terminating transactions in case the agreement has been renounced.
