= List of shipwrecks in 1921 =

The list of shipwrecks in 1921 includes ships sunk, foundered, grounded, or otherwise lost during 1921.

table of contents
1921
Jan	Feb	Mar	Apr
May	Jun	Jul	Aug
Sep	Oct	Nov	Dec
Unknown date

== January ==
=== 2 January ===
List of shipwrecks: 2 January 1921
Ship	State	Description
Broadmayne	United Kingdom	The cargo ship ran aground at Dartmouth, Devon. She broke in two on 7 January.
Santa Isabel	Spain	The passenger ship ran aground off Sálvora, Galicia. She broke in two and sank with the loss of 244 of the 300 people on board.
Scottish Monarch	United Kingdom	The cargo ship ran aground in the River Clyde at Cardross, Lanarkshire. She was refloated on 6 January.

=== 3 January ===
List of shipwrecks: 3 January 1921
Ship	State	Description
Euphrates	United Kingdom	The cargo ship foundered in the Atlantic Ocean (44°24′N 45°27′W). Her crew were rescued by Galileo (United Kingdom).
Tris Adelphis	Greece	The cargo ship sprang a leak and sank in the Tyrrhenian Sea 25 nautical miles (46 km) east of Mount Circeo, Lazio, Italy.
UB-88	United States	The Type UB III submarine was scuttled in the Pacific Ocean off San Pedro, California by USS Wilkes (United States Navy).

=== 5 January ===
List of shipwrecks: 5 January 1921
Ship	State	Description
Ardoyne	United Kingdom	The cargo ship ran aground at Cape Frio, Brazil. She was refloated on 18 January.

=== 6 January ===
List of shipwrecks: 6 January 1921
Ship	State	Description
USS Coast Defense Battleship No. 2	United States Navy	USS Coast Defense Battleship No. 2 sinking The decommissioned battleship (ex-USS Massachusetts) was scuttled in shallow water in the Gulf of Mexico off Pensacola, Florida. The wreck subsequently was used as a United States Army Coast Artillery Corps target, then became an artificial reef and recreational diving site.

=== 7 January ===
List of shipwrecks: 7 January 1921
Ship	State	Description
Ekelund	Norway	The full-rigged ship caught fire and was abandoned in the Atlantic Ocean (7°32′N 32°57′W). She was on a voyage from Durban, South Africa to Sarpsborg, Norway.
Marion	United Kingdom	The schooner departed Liverpool, Lancashire for Fowey, Cornwall. No further trace, presumed foundered with the loss of all hands.

=== 9 January ===
List of shipwrecks: 9 January 1921
Ship	State	Description
Elipidifor No.415	Russia	Russian Civil War: The Elipidifor type auxiliary gunboat was damaged by Sakalave (French Navy) at Anapa in the Black Sea. She was beached and abandoned.

=== 10 January ===
List of shipwrecks: 10 January 1921
Ship	State	Description
Cabo Roche	Spain	The coaster caught fire and foundered in the Ligurian Sea 6 nautical miles (11 km) off Cape Mele, Liguria, Italy. Her crew were rescued.
Mintie	United Kingdom	The schooner was abandoned and set afire in the Atlantic Ocean (44°15′N 27°10′W). Her crew were rescued by Anversoise (United Kingdom).

=== 12 January ===
List of shipwrecks: 12 January 1921
Ship	State	Description
Acacia	United Kingdom	The cargo ship was beached near Hurst Castle, Hampshire.
Aspasia Stavroudis	Greece	The cargo ship caught fire in the Aegean Sea 8 nautical miles (15 km) east of Carpatsos. She sank the next day, her crew survived.
Christoforos	Greece	The cargo ship sank in the Mediterranean Sea off Cape Papa.
Ontaneda	Norway	The cargo ship foundered in the Atlantic Ocean (47°20′N 40°05′W). Her crew were rescued by Fanad Head (United Kingdom).

=== 15 January ===
List of shipwrecks: 15 January 1921
Ship	State	Description
Horley	United Kingdom	The coaster was struck by another vessel in the River Thames at Blackwall, London and sank. She was refloated on 18 January.

=== 16 January ===
List of shipwrecks: 16 January 1921
Ship	State	Description
Carmelita	Venezuela	The cargo ship was destroyed by fire at Puerto Cabello and was a total loss.
Tayside	United Kingdom	The 105-foot (32 m), 137-ton coastal cargo ship foundered 5 miles (8.0 km) east southeast from the Galley Lighthouse.

=== 17 January ===
List of shipwrecks: 17 January 1921
Ship	State	Description
Claremorris	United Kingdom	The cargo ship struck rocks at Durat Point and was beached in the Sound of Islay.
HMS Marjoram	Royal Navy	Bound for Haulbowline, where she was to undergo a refit to become the drill ship HMS President, the Anchusa-class sloop-of-war was wrecked on Flintstone Head.

=== 18 January ===
List of shipwrecks: 18 January 1921
Ship	State	Description
Dover Castle	United Kingdom	The brigantine came ashore at Zierikzee, Netherlands and was wrecked.
Pandora	United Kingdom	The schooner sprang a leak and was abandoned in the Irish Sea off Beaumaris, Anglesey. Her crew were rescued by the Beaumaris Lifeboat.

=== 19 January ===
List of shipwrecks: 19 January 1921
Ship	State	Description
Daisy	Germany	The schooner was abandoned in the North Sea off IJmuiden, Netherlands. Her crew were rescued by the trawler Ymuiden 146 (Netherlands). Daisy was discovered derelict by the trawler Hohenfels (Germany) and towed into Nordenham, Germany, arriving on 27 January.
Juanita	United States	While no one was on board, the 7-net register ton motor vessel burned to the waterline and sank while at anchor in Surprise Harbor (57°01′N 134°35′W) in Southeast Alaska.
Kibi Maru No.2	Japan	The cargo ship ran aground 100 nautical miles (190 km) south of Thursday Island, Queensland, Australia. She was refloated on 7 February.

=== 20 January ===
List of shipwrecks: 20 January 1921
Ship	State	Description
HMS K5	Royal Navy	The K-class submarine foundered in the Atlantic Ocean 120 nautical miles (220 km) south west of the Isles of Scilly with the loss of all fifty-seven crew.

=== 22 January ===
List of shipwrecks: 22 January 1921
Ship	State	Description
Afrodite	Greece	The cargo ship ran aground at Westcar, Yorkshire, United Kingdom. Her crew were rescued before she sank.
Newton Stanley Lake	United Kingdom	The schooner was abandoned in the Atlantic Ocean off the coast of Virginia, United States. Her crew were rescued.

=== 24 January ===
List of shipwrecks: 24 January 1921
Ship	State	Description
Carioca	United States	The barquentine was set afire and abandoned in the Mediterranean Sea (34°20′N 23°40′E). Her crew were rescued.

=== 25 January ===
List of shipwrecks: 25 January 1921
Ship	State	Description
Adamantios Lemos	Greece	The cargo ship en route from Portman, Spain to Middlesbrough foundered near Guernsey Channel Islands. She had previously been salvaged in April 1919 by HM Tug St Issey.
Hewitt	United States	SS Hewitt The cargo ship last reported from the Atlantic Ocean 250 nautical miles (460 km) north of Jupiter Inlet, Florida. No further trace, presumed foundered with the loss of her 42 crew. She made her regular radio calls on 24 January and 25 January, and reported nothing unusual. She was last seen 250 nautical miles (460 km) north of Jupiter Inlet, Florida. From that time to this, she remains missing. No further radio signals from her were received. After Hewitt failed to arrive in Boston on its expected due date of 29 January, Union Sulphur sent the ship's wireless call (K I L) through Atlantic coastal stations, and notified the United States Navy. A huge search along her route found nothing. US Coast Guard officials in Atlantic City reported hearing an explosion and seeing a flash approximately 20 miles (32 km) offshore on the night of 3 February 1921, and connected this event with the Hewitt.
Zannis	Greece	The cargo ship sank in the Aegean Sea 25 nautical miles (46 km) north west of Sapientza. Her crew were rescued.

=== 26 January ===
List of shipwrecks: 26 January 1921
Ship	State	Description
Tay	United Kingdom	The coaster sailed from Saint Sampson, Guernsey, Channel Islands for Portsmouth, Hampshire. No further trace, presumed foundered in the English Channel with the loss of all hands.

=== 28 January ===
List of shipwrecks: 28 January 1921
Ship	State	Description
Donald T	United Kingdom	The schooner was abandoned in the Atlantic Ocean. Her crew were rescued.

=== 29 January ===
List of shipwrecks: 29 January 1921
Ship	State	Description
España	Spanish Navy	The España-class battleship ran aground off Puerto Montt, Chile. She was later refloated, repaired and returned to service.
Pommern	Germany	The cargo ship ran aground at Rørvik, Norway. She was still ashore on 5 February.

=== 31 January ===
List of shipwrecks: 31 January 1921
Ship	State	Description
Carroll A. Deering	United States	The five-masted schooner ran aground on the Diamond Shoals and was abandoned. The wreck was dispersed by dynamite on 4 March.

=== Unknown date ===
List of shipwrecks: Unknown date January 1921
Ship	State	Description
SMS Baden	Royal Navy	The decommissioned former Imperial German Navy battleship foundered in heavy seas in the English Channel off Whale Island, Hampshire, England, after use as a gunnery target by the shore establishment HMS Excellent and the monitor HMS Terror (both Royal Navy). Baden was refloated three months later and put back into use as a target ship.
HMS Europa	Royal Navy	Under tow after being sold out of naval service, the decommissioned Diadem-class protected cruiser sank off Corsica in a gale. She later was refloated and scrapped.
Heiyei Maru No.2	Japan	The cargo ship foundered off Toba, Mie.

== February ==
=== 1 February ===
List of shipwrecks: 1 February 1921
Ship	State	Description
Timios Stavros	Greece	The cargo ship foundered in the Atlantic Ocean between Cape Roca and the Berlengas, Portugal. Her crew were rescued by a Spanish merchant ship.

=== 2 February ===
List of shipwrecks: 2 February 1921
Ship	State	Description
Esperanza de Larrinaga	United Kingdom	The cargo ship departed from Norfolk, Virginia for Reggio Calabria, Italy. No further trace, presumed foundered with the loss of all hands.
Lake Elmwood	United States	The Design 1074 cargo ship ran aground in the Kaiser Wilhelm Canal, Germany. She was refloated on 7 February.
Léon Bonnat	France	The schooner ran aground on the Crym Rocks off the Isles of Scilly, United Kingdom and was wrecked.

=== 3 February ===
List of shipwrecks: 3 February 1921
Ship	State	Description
Mertainen	Sweden	The cargo ship ran aground at the entrance of the Trondheimsfjord, Norway. She was refloated but consequently beached.
Oak	United Kingdom	The cargo ship ran aground east of The Skerries, Anglesey and was abandoned by her crew. She was later refloated and towed into Holyhead.

=== 6 February ===
List of shipwrecks: 6 February 1921
Ship	State	Description
Ottawa	United Kingdom	The cargo ship, on a voyage from Norfolk, Virginia, United States to Manchester, Lancashire was in communication with Dorrington Court (United Kingdom). No further trace, presumed foundered with the loss of all hands.

=== 7 February ===
List of shipwrecks: 7 February 1921
Ship	State	Description
Klamate	United States	The cargo ship was wrecked whilst on a voyage from San Francisco, California to Portland, Oregon. Her crew were rescued.
Vital	Germany	The cargo ship collided with another vessel and sank off Delfzijl, Netherlands. Her crew were rescued by the other vessel.

=== 8 February ===
List of shipwrecks: 8 February 1921
Ship	State	Description
Eskdale	United Kingdom	The cargo ship came ashore at the Heugh Lighthouse, Hartlepool, County Durham and was wrecked.

=== 9 February ===
List of shipwrecks: 9 February 1921
Ship	State	Description
HMS Hydra	Royal Navy	The Acheron-class destroyer collided with the torpedo boat Z 3 (Royal Navy) in the Weilingen Channel and sank. All 72 crew were rescued by Z 3.
Iocasti	Greece	The cargo ship caught fire in the Mediterranean Sea (36°44′N 1°28′W) and was abandoned.
Margarita	Greece	The cargo ship foundered on this date.
Sparkling Glance	United Kingdom	The schooner was abandoned in the Atlantic Ocean.

=== 11 February ===
List of shipwrecks: 11 February 1921
Ship	State	Description
Abracadabrante	Spain	The schooner collided with Swainby (United Kingdom) in the English Channel off Hartland Point, Devon and sank. Her crew were rescued by Swainby.
Bombardier	Belgium	The cargo ship foundered in the Atlantic Ocean (45°53′N 54°10′W).
Marion Grace	United Kingdom	The schooner was driven ashore at Saint-Pierre, Saint Pierre and Miquelon and was wrecked.

=== 12 February ===
List of shipwrecks: 12 February 1921
Ship	State	Description
Elizabeth Fearn	United Kingdom	The schooner was driven ashore at St. John's, Newfoundland and was wrecked.
Horley	United Kingdom	The cargo ship parted from her tow and cane ashore at Covehithe, Suffolk. She was refloated on 25 February.
Osiris	United States	The houseboat/yacht burned and sank off Miami, Florida.

=== 13 February ===
List of shipwrecks: 13 February 1921
Ship	State	Description
Hawker	United Kingdom	The schooner departed Patras, Greece, for Trapani, Sicily, Italy. No further trace, presumed foundered in the Mediterranean Sea with the loss of all hands.

=== 14 February ===
List of shipwrecks: 14 February 1921
Ship	State	Description
Victorieux	France	The cargo ship was abandoned in the Atlantic Ocean (39°11′N 49°01′W) with the loss of a crew member. Survivors were rescued by Cranford (United States).

=== 15 February ===
List of shipwrecks: 15 February 1921
Ship	State	Description
Gadra	United Kingdom	The steam trawler was sunk in a collision with the trawler Victorian (United Kingdom) 63 cables from the Middle Lightship. Later refloated, repaired, and returned to service.
Horace E. Munroe	United States	The schooner collided with Palma (United Kingdom) in the Atlantic Ocean (35°22′N 3°14′W) and was abandoned. Her crew were rescued by Palma.

=== 16 February ===
List of shipwrecks: 16 February 1921
Ship	State	Description
Charles G. Endicott	United States	The schooner struck a mine and sank in the Atlantic Ocean 60 nautical miles (110 km) north east of Cuba.
Progreso	Spain	The sailing ship sprang a leak and foundered in the Atlantic Ocean off the coast of Portugal. Her crew were rescued by a British merchant ship.
Tonesit	United States	The cargo ship ran aground on Ven, Sweden. She was refloated on 24 February.

=== 17 February ===
List of shipwrecks: 17 February 1921
Ship	State	Description
Delmira	United Kingdom	The tanker caught fire in the Atlantic Ocean off the coast of Florida, United States and was abandoned. Her crew were rescued by J. E. O'Neil (United States). Delmira was towed in to Key West, Florida by Victory (United States).

=== 19 February ===
List of shipwrecks: 19 February 1921
Ship	State	Description
Fernando	Portugal	The barquentine was driven ashore and sank at Madeira.
Ioanna	Greece	The cargo ship was sunk by barratry off Cape Tiñoso, Spain

=== 21 February ===
List of shipwrecks: 21 February 1921
Ship	State	Description
Miss Williams	United Kingdom	The schooner foundered in the Irish Sea 3.5 nautical miles (6.5 km) off Curracloe, County Wexford.
USS Woolsey	United States Navy	The Wickes-class destroyer sank after colliding with the steamer Steel Inventor (United States) in the Pacific Ocean off Panama City, Panama. Survivors were rescued by the destroyer USS Aaron Ward (United States Navy).

=== 24 February ===
List of shipwrecks: 24 February 1921
Ship	State	Description
Minnie J. Smith	United Kingdom	The schooner sank off Wabana, Dominion of Newfoundland.
San Pasqual	United States	The cargo ship ran aground off Port Eads, Louisiana. She was refloated on 28 February.

=== 26 February ===
List of shipwrecks: 26 February 1921
Ship	State	Description
Gregorios	Greece	The cargo ship foundered off Gibraltar. Her crew were rescued by Penmoroah (United Kingdom).

=== 27 February ===
List of shipwrecks: 27 February 1921
Ship	State	Description
Suzanna	United Kingdom	The schooner was abandoned in the Atlantic Ocean (46°50′N 7°00′W). Her crew were rescued by Archimedes (United Kingdom).

=== 28 February ===
List of shipwrecks: 28 February 1921
Ship	State	Description
Huntspill	United Kingdom	The cargo ship sank at Southampton, Hampshire.

=== Unknown date ===
List of shipwrecks: Unknown date
Ship	State	Description
Twilight	United States	While in winter storage, the 96-foot (29 m) motor excursion boat was damaged by ice and sank without loss of life in 3 to 30 feet (0.91 to 9.14 m) of water in Moosehead Lake at Greenville Junction, Maine, 10 yards (9.1 m) off the south shore of Steamboat Point at 45°28′09″N 069°37′15″W.

== March ==
=== 2 March ===
List of shipwrecks: 2 March 1921
Ship	State	Description
Charlot	France	The brigantine was destroyed by fire.

=== 3 March ===
List of shipwrecks: 3 March 1921
Ship	State	Description
Anna Laura McKenney	United States	The schooner was wrecked at Puerto México. Veracruz, Mexico.
Appolonia	Italy	The cargo ship was wrecked at İnebolu, Turkey.
Hong Moh	United Kingdom	The passenger ship struck the White Rocks off Lamock Island near Swatow, China and sank with the loss of about 1,000 lives. HMS Carlisle, HMS Foxglove (both Royal Navy) and Shansi (flag unknown) rescued 294 survivors between them.
Maria	Greece	The cargo ship caught fire and sank in the Mediterranean Sea off Phourni, Crete.
Megali Hellas	Greece	The ocean liner ran aground off Kum Kale, Turkey. She was refloated on 8 March.
Omega	United States	The barquentine departed Hobart, Tasmania, Australia for Lyttelton, New Zealand. No further trace; presumed foundered in the Pacific Ocean with the loss of all hands.
Tipperary	United Kingdom	The schooner was abandoned off Trepassey, Newfoundland.

=== 4 March ===
List of shipwrecks: 4 March 1921
Ship	State	Description
HMS Gloaming	Royal Navy	The Admiralty-type drifter was wrecked on the coast of England near The Lizard.

=== 5 March ===
List of shipwrecks: 5 March 1921
Ship	State	Description
Madimba	Belgium	The cargo ship collided with Italier (Belgium) in the North Sea off the Ruytingen Lighthouse (51°19′N 2°06′E) and sank with the loss of all 43 crew.

=== 7 March ===
List of shipwrecks: 7 March 1921
Ship	State	Description
Swan	United Kingdom	The 129.9-foot (39.6 m), 270-ton steam trawler was sunk in a collision with Edgemont (United States) in thick fog in the Atlantic Ocean 80 miles (130 km) off Lands End, Cornwall (49°26′N 11°14′W). Six people were killed and 5 survivors were picked up by the trawler Arley (United Kingdom).

=== 8 March ===
List of shipwrecks: 8 March 1921
Ship	State	Description
Ernemore	United Kingdom	The cargo ship struck a submerged wreck at Constantinople, Turkey and was beached.
Mosken	Norway	The cargo liner was wrecked at Dragnes, north-west of Hadseløya, Norway.

=== 9 March ===
List of shipwrecks: 9 March 1921
Ship	State	Description
Wandby	United Kingdom	The 3,981-gross register ton cargo ship was wrecked in fog without loss of life just off Walker's Point in Kennebunkport, Maine. Her wreck settled in up to 20 feet (6.1 m) of water.

=== 10 March ===
List of shipwrecks: 10 March 1921
Ship	State	Description
Barbara Barr	United Kingdom	The schooner was abandoned in St. Mary's Bay, Newfoundland.

=== 12 March ===
List of shipwrecks: 12 March 1921
Ship	State	Description
Alverta T.	United States	The motor vessel capsized at New Orleans in heavy fog. Six drowned.
Douglas Adams	United Kingdom	The schooner departed Lisbon, Portugal for Twillingate, Newfoundland. No further trace, presumed foundered in the Atlantic Ocean with the loss of all hands.

=== 13 March ===
List of shipwrecks: 13 March 1921
Ship	State	Description
Leonita	Spain	The cargo ship foundered in the Atlantic Ocean (36°24′N 7°30′W).

=== 14 March ===
List of shipwrecks: 14 March 1921
Ship	State	Description
Fredville	United Kingdom	The coaster collided with Vincennes Bridge (United States) in the North Sea and sank. Her crew were rescued.
Frieda E.	United Kingdom	The schooner caught fire and was abandoned in the Atlantic Ocean (33°44′N 63°26′W). Her crew were rescued by Hofuku Maru (Japan).
Guillermo	Spain	The cargo ship foundered in the Atlantic Ocean off Porto, Portugal. Her crew were rescued by Niki ( Greece).

=== 18 March ===
List of shipwrecks: 18 March 1921
Ship	State	Description
Zuzatzarte	Spain	The cargo ship was driven ashore near Bilbao and was wrecked.

=== 21 March ===
List of shipwrecks: 21 March 1921
Ship	State	Description
City of Colombo	United Kingdom	The ocean liner ran aground off Petite Passage, New Brunswick, Canada. She was subsequently declared a total loss.
Elizabeth Charlotte	United Kingdom	The three-masted schooner departed King's Lynn, Norfolk for the Tyne. No further trace, presumed foundered in the North Sea with the loss of all hands.
Governor Brooke	United States	The schooner ran aground at Castillo and was abandoned. Her crew were rescued by Ballington (United Kingdom).

=== 26 March ===
List of shipwrecks: 26 March 1921
Ship	State	Description
Magic	New Zealand	The 94 GRT auxiliary scow was tacking against the wind, when she ran aground on Inconstant Point, just north of Pencarrow Head. The crew of four sheltered at the lighthouse.

=== 28 March ===
List of shipwrecks: 28 March 1921
Ship	State	Description
Ituna	United Kingdom	The cargo ship struck a mine and sank in the Ionian Sea off Santa Maura, Greece.
Roberta Ray	United Kingdom	The schooner was set afire and abandoned in the Atlantic Ocean (43°14′N 48°11′W). Her crew were rescued by Triumph (United Kingdom).

=== 31 March ===
List of shipwrecks: 31 March 1921
Ship	State	Description
Gaelic Prince	United Kingdom	The cargo ship came ashore at Nantucket, Massachusetts, United States. She was refloated on 7 April.
Rontegui	Spain	The cargo ship sprang a leak in the Atlantic Ocean off San Sebastián, Gipuzkoa. She sank in the early hours of 1 April. Her crew were rescued by Laya (Spanish Navy).
Zilla May	United States	The 70-gross register ton, 77.3-foot (23.6 m) fishing vessel was wrecked without loss of life near Strait Island (56°23′10″N 133°42′30″W) in Southeast Alaska. Her crew of 17 abandoned ship early on 1 April, and Zilla May sank about 20 minutes later. After spending 1 April on Strait Island, the crew rowed to Wrangell, Territory of Alaska, in three dories on 2 April.

=== Unknown date ===
List of shipwrecks: Unknown date March 1921
Ship	State	Description
USS Conestoga	United States Navy	Stern view of the wreck of Conestoga in 2014. The tug disappeared after departing Mare Island Navy Yard in Vallejo, California, on 25 March 1921 with the loss of her entire crew of 56. Her wreck was not discovered until 2014; it lies in the Pacific Ocean 3.1 nautical miles (5.7 km) off Southeast Farallon Island. She presumably sank in a gale on 26 March 1921.

== April ==
=== 1 April ===
List of shipwrecks: 1 April 1921
Ship	State	Description
Governor	United States	The passenger ship collided with West Hartland (United States) in the Pacific Ocean one and a quarter miles (2.0 km) south east of Point Wilson off Port Townsend, Washington, or Seattle, Washington and sank. All on board were rescued by West Hartland, or nine killed, survivors transferred.

=== 2 April ===
List of shipwrecks: 2 April 1921
Ship	State	Description
Lewis H. Goward	United States	The schooner was caught fire in the Atlantic Ocean off the Rebecca Shoal Lighthouse and was a total loss.

=== 3 April ===
List of shipwrecks: 3 April 1921
Ship	State	Description
Kating	Greece	The coaster struck a submerged object and sank in the North Sea 3 nautical miles (5.6 km) off the North Hinder Lightship (Netherlands) and sank. Her crew were rescued.

=== 9 April ===
List of shipwrecks: 9 April 1921
Ship	State	Description
Fenice	Peru	The cargo ship was wrecked on Lobos de Tierra Island.
Tommie G	United Kingdom	The schooner was abandoned in the Atlantic Ocean (40°28′N 46°17′W). She was set afire by her crew, who were rescued by Waaldijk (Netherlands).

=== 11 April ===
List of shipwrecks: 11 April 1921
Ship	State	Description
Colonel Bowie or Col. Bowie	United States	The cargo ship sprung a leak in heavy weather and foundered in the Gulf of Mexico between Beaumont, Texas and Tampico, Mexico, with the loss of six of the 22 crew on board. Although there were conflicting reports during the crisis, the British steamer Cissy picked up three men the day after the wreck and another 13 were rescued off of Tampico the next day. Two weeks after the incident, a newspaper noted that there were "six men still missing from the crew of the steamship Colonel Bowie".

=== 13 April ===
List of shipwrecks: 13 April 1921
Ship	State	Description
Huntley	United Kingdom	The schooner sank off Cape Spear, Newfoundland. Her crew survived. She later refloated due to her cargo of salt dissolving and was towed in to St. John's.
Johanne	Germany	The cargo ship collided with Edel (Denmark) in the Skagerrak 6 nautical miles (11 km) south of Fredrikshavn, Nordjylland, Denmark and sank. Her crew were rescued.

=== 14 April ===
List of shipwrecks: 14 April 1921
Ship	State	Description
Kamchatka	United States	During a voyage from Seattle, Washington, to Petropavlovsk-Kamchatsky on the Kamchatka Peninsula in Siberia carrying 436 tons of general trading cargo, the 552-ton motor ship was abandoned in the North Pacific Ocean 400 nautical miles (740 km; 460 mi) south of the Territory of Alaska's Shumagin Islands at a position determined by dead reckoning as 51°57′N 154°53′W after an engine room fire went out of control. Her crew of 23 abandoned ship in a launch and a whaleboat and reached the Shumagin Islands safely 86 hours later. Kamchatka's burned-out and dismasted hulk drifted far to the south, where it was last sighted on 23 May 1921.

=== 15 April ===
List of shipwrecks: 15 April 1921
Ship	State	Description
Poolena	United Kingdom	The coaster ran aground at Dunfanaghy, County Donegal. Her crew survived. She was refloated on 21 April.

=== 16 April ===
List of shipwrecks: 16 April 1921
Ship	State	Description
Eugenia	Greece	The cargo ship foundered off the Berlengas, Portugal.
Ningpo	United Kingdom	The cargo ship was driven ashore and sank at Chefoo, China.

=== 18 April ===
List of shipwrecks: 18 April 1921
Ship	State	Description
Iron Monarch	United Kingdom	The cargo ship ran aground at Port Pirie, South Australia. She was refloated on 21 April.
Queenie R	United Kingdom	The schooner foundered in the Atlantic Ocean off Bermuda. Her crew were rescued by British Marshall (United Kingdom).

=== 20 April ===
List of shipwrecks: 20 April 1921
Ship	State	Description
S & C	United States	Still hauled out on the shore of the Taku River in the Territory of Alaska for the winter of 1920–1921 and with no one on board, the 8-gross register ton, 34.3-foot (10.5 m) motor vessel was destroyed when ice breaking up on the river during the spring thaw crushed her.

=== 21 April ===
List of shipwrecks: 21 April 1921
Ship	State	Description
Tree Villa	United Kingdom	The coaster, which had struck a submerged object on 19 April, sank in the Bristol Channel 5 nautical miles (9.3 km) north east of Skokholm, Pembrokeshire. Her crew survived.

=== 22 April ===
List of shipwrecks: 22 April 1921
Ship	State	Description
No. 307	Russian Navy	The K-class armored river gunboat was lost on this date.

=== 23 April ===
List of shipwrecks: 23 April 1921
Ship	State	Description
Annunziata	Italy	The schooner was driven onto rocks at Sliema, Malta and was wrecked. All six crew were rescued.
Elpis	Greece	The cargo ship foundered in the Mediterranean Sea 24 nautical miles (44 km) north east of Acre, Palestine.

=== 27 April ===
List of shipwrecks: 27 April 1921
Ship	State	Description
Arnus	Spain	The cargo ship sprang a leak and foundered whilst on a voyage from Viveiro, Spain, to Rotterdam, Netherlands. Twenty-one of her 33 crew were rescued.

=== 28 April ===
List of shipwrecks: 28 April 1921
Ship	State	Description
Bona H	United Kingdom	The schooner was destroyed by fire off Havana, Cuba.

=== 29 April ===
List of shipwrecks: 29 April 1921
Ship	State	Description
Bara Bi	Spain	The passenger ship sdprang a leak and foundered in the Atlantic Ocean (approximately 48°N 5°W). All on board were rescued by Helena (Netherlands).
Mormugao	Portugal	The passenger ship ran aground on the south of Block Island, Rhode Island, United States. Her passengers were taken off. She was refloated on 2 May.
Spathari	United Kingdom	The cargo ship was sunk by barratry in the Atlantic Ocean off Ericeira, Portugal. Her crew were rescued.

=== 30 April ===
List of shipwrecks: 30 April 1921
Ship	State	Description
E. A. Sabean	United Kingdom	The schooner sprang a leak and sank in the Atlantic Ocean off Pensacola, Florida. Her crew were rescued.
Gloria	France	The ship foundered in the Mediterranean Sea off Soller, Mallorca, Spain. All 28 crew were rescued.

== May ==
=== 1 May ===
List of shipwrecks: 1 May 1921
Ship	State	Description
Lysglimt	Denmark	The schooner caught fire in the Atlantic Ocean (27°55′N 41°01′W). She was abandoned on 4 May and burnt out. Her crew were rescued by Vittorio Veneto (United Kingdom).

=== 3 May ===
List of shipwrecks: 3 May 1921
Ship	State	Description
Tokuyo Maru	Japan	The passenger ship caught fire and sank in the Pacific Ocean. USAT Buford (United States Army) rescued 65 people.

=== 4 May ===
List of shipwrecks: 4 May 1921
Ship	State	Description
Mary Eleanor	United Kingdom	The cargo ship foundered in the Irish Sea. Her crew survived.

=== 5 May ===
List of shipwrecks: 5 May 1921
Ship	State	Description
Admiral Keyes	United Kingdom	The auxiliary schooner sprang a leak in the North Sea and was beached off Hartlepool, County Durham She was refloated on 6 May.

=== 6 May ===
List of shipwrecks: 6 May 1921
Ship	State	Description
Sao Paulo	Brazil	The cargo ship sank at Rio de Janeiro.

=== 12 May ===
List of shipwrecks: 12 May 1921
Ship	State	Description
Lois	United Kingdom	The 135-foot (41 m) 310-ton steam trawler stranded at Blackgang, Isle of Wight. crew taken off by local boat. She was refloated after patching but grounded again 50 yards (46 m) out and was further damaged and became a total loss.
Stad Schiedam	Netherlands	The cargo ship ran aground at Marstenen Bo, Norway, and was beached.

=== 13 May ===
List of shipwrecks: 13 May 1921
Ship	State	Description
Miztec	United States	The barge foundered in Lake Superior 10 nautical miles (19 km) off Vermillion Point, Michigan, with the loss of all seven crew.

=== 14 May ===
List of shipwrecks: 14 May 1921
Ship	State	Description
Karatara	United Kingdom	The coaster caught fire 20 nautical miles (37 km) off Cape Town, South Africa and was abandoned. All passengers and crew were rescued. Karatara was subsequently towed into Cape Town extensively damaged.
Wollongbar	United Kingdom	The cargo ship was wrecked at Byron Bay, New South Wales, Australia.

=== 16 May ===
List of shipwrecks: 16 May 1921
Ship	State	Description
City of Pascagoula	Italy	The schooner caught fire at Genoa and was scuttled.

=== 20 May ===
List of shipwrecks: 20 May 1921
Ship	State	Description
Manuel Carsi	Spain	The cargo ship sprang a leak and sank in the Mediterranean Sea 20 nautical miles (37 km) off Cape Vilano, Algeria. Her crew were rescued.

=== 23 May ===
List of shipwrecks: 23 May 1921
Ship	State	Description
USS Granite State	United States Navy	The stores ship, a former ship of the line, caught fire and sank in the Hudson River. She was refloated in July 1922.

=== 24 May ===
List of shipwrecks: 24 May 1921
Ship	State	Description
Atua	United Kingdom	The cargo ship struck rocks and was beached at Naitonitoni, Fiji. She was refloated on 6 June.

=== 26 May ===
List of shipwrecks: 26 May 1921
Ship	State	Description
Esperanto	United States	The schooner struck a submerged wreck in the Atlantic Ocean off Sable Island, Nova Scotia, Canada and foundered.

=== 27 May ===
List of shipwrecks: 27 May 1921
Ship	State	Description
Dannedaike	United States	The cargo ship sank at Philadelphia, Pennsylvania.

=== 28 May ===
List of shipwrecks: 28 May 1921
Ship	State	Description
Antiope	United Kingdom	The tanker caught fire at Surabaya, Netherlands East Indies, and was a total loss. Her crew were rescued.
William Finglay	United Kingdom	The cargo ship sank in the North Sea 4 nautical miles (7.4 km) south east of Tod Point, Yorkshire, UK.

=== 30 May ===
List of shipwrecks: 30 May 1921
Ship	State	Description
Ise Maru	Japan	The cargo ship was wrecked at Nossaenpu, Hokkaidō.

=== 31 May ===
List of shipwrecks: 31 May 1921
Ship	State	Description
Riojun Maru	Japan	The cargo ship ran aground on a reef in the Gaspar Straits and was wrecked.

== June ==
=== 1 June ===
List of shipwrecks: 1 June 1921
Ship	State	Description
Laura A. Barnes	United States	The four-masted schooner was wrecked on Bod's Island, Virginia.

=== 2 June ===
List of shipwrecks: 2 June 1921
Ship	State	Description
Mount Rainier	United States	The four-masted schooner was destroyed by fire at Santa Fe, Argentina.

=== 3 June ===
List of shipwrecks: 3 June 1921
Ship	State	Description
Royetsu Maru No.2	Japan	The cargo ship foundered 33 nautical miles (61 km)) off Wakamatsu. Her crew were rescued.

=== 4 June ===
List of shipwrecks: 4 June 1921
Ship	State	Description
Burma Maru	Japan	The cargo ship arrived at Gibraltar on fire. She was beached, but was refloated on 7 June.
Matilde	Italy	The cargo ship caught fire in the Bosporus and was beached at Büyükdere, Koçarlı, Turkey.

=== 6 June ===
List of shipwrecks: 6 June 1921
Ship	State	Description
Ramon Mumbru	Spain	The cargo ship sprang a leak and sank in the Mediterranean Sea off Cavalaire-sur-Mer, Var, France.

=== 7 June ===
List of shipwrecks: 7 June 1921
Ship	State	Description
U-151	French Navy	The Type U 151 submarine was sunk as a target in the English Channel off Cherbourg, Manche.
USS UC-97	United States Navy	The Type UC III submarine was sunk as a target in Lake Michigan east of Highland Park, Illinois, at (41°10′N 87°20′W) by USS Wilmette (United States Navy).

=== 9 June ===
List of shipwrecks: 9 June 1921
Ship	State	Description
North Shore	United Kingdom	The cargo ship caught fire at Quebec City, Canada and was beached.

=== 10 June ===
List of shipwrecks: 10 June 1921
Ship	State	Description
Bouboulina	Greece	The cargo ship struck a mine and sank in the Gulf of Smyrna off Uzunada, Turkey with the loss of 22 of her 30 crew. Two of the survivors were rescued by Lemnos (Royal Hellenic Navy).
Laretana	Spain	The cargo ship sprang a leak and sank in the Atlantic Ocean off the coast of Portugal.
Ville d'Algée	France	The cargo ship sprang a leak and sank at Marseille, Bouches-du-Rhône.
Woodbine	United Kingdom	The cargo ship was driven ashore and sank at Bruneval, Seine-Inférieure, France.

=== 13 June ===
List of shipwrecks: 13 June 1921
Ship	State	Description
Canastota	United Kingdom	The cargo ship departed Sydney, New South Wales, Australia for Wellington, New Zealand. Presumed foundered in the Pacific Ocean with the loss of her 49 crew. Fire-damaged wreckage from the ship washed up on Lord Howe Island, New South Wales on 10 August.

=== 16 June ===
List of shipwrecks: 16 June 1921
Ship	State	Description
Cid Campeador	Spain	The cargo ship caught fire at Bilbao and was beached. She was declared a total loss.
Olympia	Greece	The cargo ship ran aground on the Formigas Rocks, Azores, Portugal and was wrecked. Her crew survived.

=== 20 June ===
List of shipwrecks: 20 June 1921
Ship	State	Description
Gallia	United Kingdom	The cargo ship sank at Calcutta, India.

=== 21 June ===
List of shipwrecks: 21 June 1921
Ship	State	Description
USS G-1	United States Navy	The decommissioned G-class submarine was sunk as a target in 100 feet (30 m) of water in the East Passage of Narragansett Bay, 625 yards (572 m) bearing 42 degrees true from Taylor Point, Jamestown, Rhode Island, at 41°30.889′N 071°21.246′W by eight depth charges dropped by the minesweeper USS Grebe (United States Navy).
Islandia	United Kingdom	The cargo ship sank at Piraeus, Greece. Ship was refloated on 27 June.

=== 22 June ===
List of shipwrecks: 22 June 1921
Ship	State	Description
USS U-117	United States Navy	The Type UE II submarine was bombed and sunk as a target in the Atlantic Ocean 50 nautical miles (93 km) east of the Cape Charles Lightship ( United States Coast Guard) by three Felixstowe F5L aircraft of the United States Navy.

=== 23 June ===
List of shipwrecks: 23 June 1921
Ship	State	Description
Monte Bianco	Italy	The vessel caught fire in the Pacific Ocean (29°S 151°W) and was abandoned.

=== 24 June ===
List of shipwrecks: 24 June 1921
Ship	State	Description
Helen Mathers	United Kingdom	The schooner came ashore at Galveston, Texas, United States and was wrecked.
HMS K15	Royal Navy	The K-class submarine sank at Portsmouth, Hampshire. She was refloated on 7 July.

=== 26 June ===
List of shipwrecks: 26 June 1921
Ship	State	Description
Fitzroy	Australia	The passenger ship foundered off the coast of New South Wales with the loss of 31 of the 35 people on board.

=== 27 June ===
List of shipwrecks: 27 June 1921
Ship	State	Description
Ferrum	United Kingdom	The cargo ship was driven ashore at Tréguier, Côtes-du-Nord, France. She was refloated on 4 July.
Stella	Sweden	The auxiliary sailing ship sprang a leak and foundered in the North Sea 240 nautical miles (440 km) north north east of Spurn Point, Yorkshire, United Kingdom. All five crew were rescued by the trawler Romilly (United Kingdom).

=== 28 June ===
List of shipwrecks: 28 June 1921
Ship	State	Description
Brae Lossie	United Kingdom	The cargo ship came ashore at Roscoff, Finistère, France and was wrecked. Her crew were rescued.
Isla de Cabrera	Spain	The cargo ship sprang a leak and sank in the Mediterranean Sea 5 nautical miles (9.3 km) south east of the Medes Islands. Her crew were rescued by a Spanish fishing vessel.
Sabine	United States	The dredger caught fire and sank at Tampico, Tamaulipas, Mexico. She was a total loss.

=== 30 June ===
List of shipwrecks: 30 June 1921
Ship	State	Description
Edward A. Cohan	United Kingdom	The schooner was destroyed by fire at Pascagoula, Mississippi, United States.
Mopang	United States	The EFC Design 1023 cargo ship was sunk by a mine in the Black Sea at the entrance to Burgas Bay.
U-152	United Kingdom	The Type U 151 submarine was sunk as a target in the English Channel off the Isle of Wight by the Royal Navy.
U-153	United Kingdom	The Type U 151 submarine was scuttled in the English Channel off the Isle of Wight.
U-161	United Kingdom	The Type U 93 submarine was expended as a target.

== July ==
=== 1 July ===
List of shipwrecks: 1 July 1921
Ship	State	Description
U-121	French Navy	The Type UE II submarine was sunk as a target in the English Channel off Cherbourg, Manche.

=== 4 July ===
List of shipwrecks: 4 July 1921
Ship	State	Description
Cambrai	United Kingdom	The schooner was destroyed by fire at Galveston, Texas, United States.
Gertrude	United States	During a voyage from Nome, Territory of Alaska, to Siberia with a crew of five and a cargo of 15 tons of general merchandise, the 17-gross register ton motor schooner was beached in a sinking condition after colliding with ice and becoming trapped in it for seven hours approximately 12 nautical miles (22 km; 14 mi) southwest of a location identified in the wreck report as "East Cape," probably Cape Dezhnev on the coast of Siberia but possibly Apavawook Cape (63.1442°N 168.8711°W) on the coast of Saint Lawrence Island in the Bering Sea. Her crew survived, but the surf pounded her to pieces.

=== 6 July ===
List of shipwrecks: 6 July 1921
Ship	State	Description
Margaret	United States	The 55-gross register ton motor vessel was destroyed by an explosion and fire while loading distillate oil at a dock at Katalla, Territory of Alaska. All three crewmen aboard her at the time suffered burns but survived.

=== 7 July ===
List of shipwrecks: 7 July 1921
Ship	State	Description
Eastern Sword	United States	The cargo ship ran aground at Belfast, County Antrim, United Kingdom. She was refloated on 10 July.

=== 8 July ===
List of shipwrecks: 8 July 1921
Ship	State	Description
Cap Blanc	France	The cargo ship foundered in the Atlantic Ocean off Peniche, Portugal. Her crew were rescued.
Western Comet	United States	The cargo ship ran aground at Saint-Nazaire, Loire-Inférieure, France. She was refloated on 21 July.

=== 9 July ===
List of shipwrecks: 9 July 1921
Ship	State	Description
Onoria	Italy	The cargo ship caught fire in the Mediterranean Sea off Cape Matapan, Greece and sank (36°29′N 22°00′E). Her crew were rescued.

=== 11 July ===
List of shipwrecks: 11 July 1921
Ship	State	Description
General Pershing	Norway	The five-masted schooner struck the Endymion Rock, Turks Islands and was wrecked. Her crew were rescued.
Western Front	United States	The steamship foundered several miles west of the Isles of Scilly when she caught fire after an explosion. She was carrying 7,000 tons of naval stores, including naphtha, turpentine and resin from Jacksonville to London. One member of the crew lost his life.

=== 12 July ===
List of shipwrecks: 12 July 1921
Ship	State	Description
Manuel L. Villaverde	Spain	The passenger ship struck rocks off the coast of Nigeria. She broke in two and sank. All on board were rescued.

=== 13 July ===
List of shipwrecks: 13 July 1921
Ship	State	Description
General Turner	United Kingdom	The cargo ship struck a mine and sank in the Black Sea off Cape Kaliakra, Bulgaria. Her crew were rescued.
Roxana Burton	United Kingdom	The schooner was abandoned in the Mediterranean Sea 60 nautical miles (110 km) south east of Cape Palos, Spain. Her crew were rescued by the sailing ship Novelty (flag unknown).

=== 15 July ===
List of shipwrecks: 15 July 1921
Ship	State	Description
E. Marie Brown	United States	The schooner was rammed and sunk in the Atlantic Ocean 30 nautical miles (56 km) east of Fire Island, New York by Harmodius (United Kingdom). Four of her crew were killed.
V43	German Empire	The ex-German large torpedo boat, allocated to the United States under the Treaty of Versailles, was sunk as a target off Cape Henry by the American battleship Florida.

=== 16 July ===
List of shipwrecks: 16 July 1921
Ship	State	Description
Aida	Netherlands	The schooner was wrecked in the Caribbean Sea whilst on a voyage from Puerto Padre, Cuba to Barbados. All on board were rescued.

=== 18 July ===
List of shipwrecks: 18 July 1921
Ship	State	Description
USS Frankfurt	United States Navy	USS Frankfurt The Wiesbaden-class light cruiser (formerly Imperial German Navy) was sunk as a target ship by United States Army Air Service and United States Navy bombers in the Atlantic Ocean off Cape Henry, Virginia.

=== 19 July ===
List of shipwrecks: 19 July 1921
Ship	State	Description
Denburn	United Kingdom	The coaster was destroyed by fire in the North Sea off Collieston, Aberdeenshire. Her crew were rescued.
Tender	United Kingdom	The coaster sank at Bridgwater, Somerset.

=== 21 July ===
List of shipwrecks: 21 July 1921
Ship	State	Description
USS Ostfriesland	United States Navy	USS Ostfriesland sinking The Helgoland-class battleship (ex-Imperial German Navy) was sunk as a target by United States Army Air Service aircraft in the Atlantic Ocean off Cape Hatteras, North Carolina.
Sawa	Soviet Union	Russian Civil War: The ship was shelled and sunk by Trotsky (Soviet Navy) in the Black Sea while trying to defect to the Whites. The vessel was lost with most of her crew, four rescued.

=== 22 July ===
List of shipwrecks: 22 July 1921
Ship	State	Description
Selene	United Kingdom	The schooner caught fire in the Mozambique Channel and was abandoned. She was later towed into Majunga, Madagascar in a severely damaged state.
USS U-140	United States Navy	The Type U 139 submarine was sunk as a target in the Atlantic Ocean off Cape Charles, Virginia by the destroyer USS Dickerson (United States Navy).

=== 23 July ===
List of shipwrecks: 23 July 1921
Ship	State	Description
Acadian	United Kingdom	The schooner was destroyed by fire in the Turks Islands. Her crew were rescued.
Dagmar	Norway	The barque was wrecked off Providence Atoll, Seychelles. Her twelve crew were rescued by Louqsor (France).
Sylph	United Kingdom	The cargo ship foundered in the Bristol Channel 2 nautical miles (3.7 km) off Steep Holm, Somerset.
Ville de Casablanca	France	The cargo ship sprang a leak and sank in the Mediterranean Sea off Dellys, Algeria. Her crew were rescued.

=== 25 July ===
List of shipwrecks: 25 July 1921
Ship	State	Description
Frontier	United Kingdom	The coaster struck the pier at Port Natal, South Africa. She was holed and consequently was beached.
Parthian	United States	The cargo ship sank at Oran, Algeria due to a fire. She was refloated on 21 August.

=== 29 July ===
List of shipwrecks: 29 July 1921
Ship	State	Description
Arzila	United Kingdom	The cargo ship ran aground in the Chiloé Archipelago, Chile. She was refloated on 19 August.
Nidelv	Norway	The cargo ship was driven ashore at Musselwick, Pembrokeshire, United Kingdom and was wrecked. Her crew were rescued.
Sainte Mathilde	France	The schooner was driven ashore and wrecked at Boulogne, Pas-de-Calais. Her crew were rescued.

=== 31 July ===
List of shipwrecks: 31 July 1921
Ship	State	Description
Canadian Exporter	Canada	The cargo ship ran aground at Willapa Harbor, Washington, United States. She broke her back and was a total loss.
Duchess	United Kingdom	The schooner was discovered derelict in the English Channel (50°28′N 0°23′E) by Stockwell (United Kingdom). She was towed to Dover, Kent.

== August ==
=== 1 August ===
List of shipwrecks: 1 August 1921
Ship	State	Description
Siam Maru	Japan	The cargo ship came ashore 20 nautical miles (37 km) south of Cape Guardafui, Italian Somaliland. She was abandoned on 3 August and her crew were rescued by Kashima (Imperial Japanese Navy). Siam Maru was later destroyed by fire and was a total loss.

=== 2 August ===
List of shipwrecks: 2 August 1921
Ship	State	Description
Shirotoki Maru	Japan	The coaster was driven ashore on Tsushima Island and was wrecked. Her crew were rescued.

=== 3 August ===
List of shipwrecks: 3 August 1921
Ship	State	Description
Popi	Greece	The cargo ship was abandoned in the Mediterranean Sea after the collapse of the crowns of her fireboxes.

=== 4 August ===
List of shipwrecks: 4 August 1921
Ship	State	Description
Ellen Benzon	Denmark	The schooner was driven ashore at Seyðisfjörður, Iceland and was wrecked. Her crew were saved.
Salti I	Italy	The coaster struck a mine in the Adriatic Sea off the coast of Foggia and sank with the loss of a crew member. Survivors were rescued by Mikali (Greece).

=== 6 August ===
List of shipwrecks: 6 August 1921
Ship	State	Description
Alaska	United States	The passenger ship ran aground on Blunts Reef, 40 nautical miles (74 km) south of Eureka, California, and sank with the loss of 42 of the 214 people on board (31 passengers and 11 crew). Some of the survivors were rescued by Anyox (United Kingdom).

=== 7 August ===
List of shipwrecks: 7 August 1921
Ship	State	Description
Calimeris	Greece	The cargo ship suffered an onboard explosion in her cargo and sank in the Mediterranean Sea. Her crew were rescued by Falka (Sweden).
Golden Gate	United States	The barque ran aground on a reef 31 nautical miles (57 km) east of Point Manzanillo, Panama. She was refloated on 15 August.

=== 8 August ===
List of shipwrecks: 8 August 1921
Ship	State	Description
Celia Cohen	United Kingdom	The schooner caught fire in the Atlantic Ocean 60 nautical miles (110 km) off Cape Hatteras, North Carolina and was abandoned. Her crew were rescued by West Keene (United States).
Lady of Gaspe	United Kingdom	The passenger ship ran aground at Halifax, Nova Scotia, Canada. She was declared a total loss on 19 August.

=== 9 August ===
List of shipwrecks: 9 August 1921
Ship	State	Description
Black Arrow	United States	The cargo ship ran aground at Cape Vilano, Algeria. She was refloated on 20 August.

=== 10 August ===
List of shipwrecks: 10 August 1921
Ship	State	Description
Nellie Bywater	United Kingdom	The schooner ran aground on Holy Isle, Firth of Clyde. She was refloated on 23 August.
San Jose	United States	The cargo ship ran aground on Asuncion Island, Northern Mariana Islands. She was declared a total loss on 21 August.

=== 12 August ===
List of shipwrecks: 12 August 1921
Ship	State	Description
St Clair	France	The cargo ship caught fire at Mex, Egypt and was beached. She was a total loss.

=== 13 August ===
List of shipwrecks: 13 August 1921
Ship	State	Description
Albatross	Germany	The sailing ship collided with Garm (Sweden) at Holtenau and sank. She was refloated on 16 August.
Bethlehem	United Kingdom	The cargo ship ran aground at Little Bras d'Or, Nova Scotia, Canada. She was refloated on 18 August.
Planet	United Kingdom	The lightship was rammed and sunk in Liverpool Bay by Greenbrier (United Kingdom). All six crew were rescued. She was refloated and beached on 19 August.

=== 14 August ===
List of shipwrecks: 14 August 1921
Ship	State	Description
Ferngarth	United Kingdom	The cargo ship caught fire, was abandoned and capsized in the Atlantic Ocean.

=== 15 August ===
List of shipwrecks: 15 August 1921
Ship	State	Description
Planter	United States	The schooner foundered in the Atlantic Ocean 30 nautical miles (56 km) off Key West, Florida. Her crew survived.

=== 16 August ===
List of shipwrecks: 16 August 1921
Ship	State	Description
Baden	Royal Navy	The decommissioned former Imperial German Navy battleship was scuttled in Hurd's Deep in the English Channel immediately after use as a gunnery target by the monitor HMS Erebus (Royal Navy) and as an aerial bombing target by Royal Air Force aircraft.
Heiyei Maru No.2	Japan	The cargo ship foundered off Toba, Mie.

=== 17 August ===
List of shipwrecks: 17 August 1921
Ship	State	Description
Francois Pierre	France	The brigantine foundered in the Ligurian Sea 40 nautical miles (74 km) off Genoa, Italy. Her crew survived.
Jex	United Kingdom	The cargo ship foundered in Lake Ontario.

=== 19 August ===
List of shipwrecks: 19 August 1921
Ship	State	Description
Canadian Recruit	Canada	The collier collided with Maskinonge (United Kingdom) in the Saint Lawrence River and sank.
King Orry	Isle of Man	The passenger ferry ran aground at New Brighton, Cheshire, United Kingdom. Over 1,300 people were rescued. King Orry was refloated later that day.

=== 20 August ===
List of shipwrecks: 20 August 1921
Ship	State	Description
Itaska	United Kingdom	The schooner was driven ashore at Saint-Pierre, Saint Pierre and Miquelon and was wrecked. Her crew were rescued.

=== 22 August ===
List of shipwrecks: 22 August 1921
Ship	State	Description
Cordillère	France	The passenger ship was driven ashore on the Tungsha Spit, at the mouth of the Yangtze, China in a typhoon. Her passengers and some of the crew were taken off on 24 August. She was refloated on 5 September.
Glaucus	United Kingdom	The cargo ship was driven ashore on the Tungsha Spit during a typhoon. She was refloated on 5 September.
Guenowle	United Kingdom	The schooner came ashore at Blakeney, Norfolk. She broke her back and was a total loss.
Henrik	Norway	The cargo ship was driven ashore at the mouth of the Yangtze during a typhoon. She was refloated on 5 September.

=== 23 August ===
List of shipwrecks: 23 August 1921
Ship	State	Description
ML498	United Kingdom	The ex Naval patrol vessel stranded on rocks at Gurnard's Head, Cornwall.

=== 26 August ===
List of shipwrecks: 26 August 1921
Ship	State	Description
Caddo	United States	The barge sank in 65 feet (20 m) of water in the North Atlantic Ocean off the coast of New Jersey southeast of Barnegat Inlet.
City of Brunswick	United States	On passage from Mobile, Alabama, to Antwerp, Belgium, with a cargo of grain and lumber, the cargo ship ran aground off Sambro Island, Halifax, Nova Scotia, Canada, and subsequently was wrecked.

=== 29 August ===
List of shipwrecks: 29 August 1921
Ship	State	Description
Monte Bianco	Italy	The cargo ship was destroyed by fire in the Pacific Ocean (approximately 29°S 151°W). Her crew were rescued.

== September ==
=== 2 September ===
List of shipwrecks: 2 September 1921
Ship	State	Description
Tornado	United States	The cargo ship sprang a leak and sank at New Orleans, Louisiana.

=== 3 September ===
List of shipwrecks: 3 September 1921
Ship	State	Description
Abessinia	Germany	The cargo ship struck the Knivestone Rock and sank in the North Sea off the Farne Islands, Northumberland, United Kingdom (55°38′46″N 1°36′16″W).

=== 4 September ===
List of shipwrecks: 4 September 1921
Ship	State	Description
Clarrie	United Kingdom	The 95.1-foot (29.0 m), 176-ton cargo ship was wrecked at the entrance to Bordeaux, Guernsey.
J. E. Backman	United Kingdom	The schooner was destroyed by fire off Watlings Island, Bahamas.

=== 5 September ===
List of shipwrecks: 5 September 1921
Ship	State	Description
Santa Teresa	Italy	The cargo ship struck a mine in the Black Sea 40 nautical miles (74 km) from the entrance to the Bosphorus and sank. The crew were rescued.

=== 7 September ===
List of shipwrecks: 7 September 1921
Ship	State	Description
Almanzora	United Kingdom	The ocean liner ran aground at Porto, Portugal. Her 1,200 passengers were taken off on 8 September. She was refloated on 13 September.
Thyra	Greece	The cargo ship sank off Lemnos.

=== 8 September ===
List of shipwrecks: 8 September 1921
Ship	State	Description
Beacon Grange	United Kingdom	The cargo ship ran aground at Río Gallegos, Santa Cruz, Argentina and was abandoned. She was declared a total loss on 12 September.
Corrib	United Kingdom	The cargo ship ran aground on the west coast of Tory Island, County Donegal. Her crew were rescued. She was abandoned as a total loss on 14 October.

=== 10 September ===
List of shipwrecks: 10 September 1921
Ship	State	Description
Cecilia Sudden	United States	The schooner caught fire in the Pacific Ocean and was abandoned.
Helvetia	United States	Sonar image of the wreck of Helvetia, June 10, 2022. The wooden barge, a former three-masted schooner, was towed into Lake Michigan by the tug Peter Reiss (United States) and set afire as a means of disposal. She burned to the waterline and sank in 165 feet (50 m) of water 10 nautical miles (19 km; 12 mi) northeast of Sheboygan, Wisconsin, at 43°47.42′N 087°36.43′W. Her wreck was located in 1975 and in 2021 was included in the Wisconsin Shipwreck Coast National Marine Sanctuary.
Le Bar	France	The 100.8-foot (30.7 m) steam trawler was sunk in a collision off Boulogne.

=== 12 September ===
List of shipwrecks: 12 September 1921
Ship	State	Description
José Salgado	Spain	The schooner sank at her moorings at Santiago de Cuba, Cuba.

=== 15 September ===
List of shipwrecks: 15 September 1921
Ship	State	Description
Louis Gustave	France	The three-masted schooner caught fire in the English Channel and was abandoned 8 nautical miles (15 km) north west of Guernsey, Channel Isles.

=== 16 September ===
List of shipwrecks: 16 September 1921
Ship	State	Description
Farlings	United Kingdom	The schooner was driven ashore and wrecked on the north east coast of Barbados.
Namara	United Kingdom	The schooner was dismasted and abandoned in the Atlantic Ocean (approximately 23°N 71°W).
Pepita Maru	Spain	The cargo ship ran aground at Utö, Finland. Her crew were rescued.
Socrates	United Kingdom	The schooner was wrecked at Barbados.
Sophie	France	The coaster struck a mine and sank in the Black Sea 14 nautical miles (26 km) off Constanţa, Romania. Her crew were rescued.

=== 17 September ===
List of shipwrecks: 17 September 1921
Ship	State	Description
São Thomé	Portugal	The cargo ship was wrecked at Mpando, French Equatorial Africa.

=== 18 September ===
List of shipwrecks: 18 September 1921
Ship	State	Description
Ville de Lyon	France	The cargo ship foundered in the Mediterranean Sea off Peñón de Alhucemas, Spanish Morocco.

=== 19 September ===
List of shipwrecks: 19 September 1921
Ship	State	Description
Malden	United States	After colliding with the steamer Jonancy (United States) off Montauk Point, Long Island, New York, in dense fog on 18 September during a voyage from Norfolk, Virginia, to Boston, Massachusetts, the 5,054-gross register ton cargo ship was beached on Long Island 1 mile (1.6 km) north of Montauk Point and 1 nautical mile (1.9 km; 1.2 mi) off shore. Her wreck settled in 40 feet (12 m) of water, and she was declared a total loss. Her crew of 42 survived and was rescued by Jonancy and the cutter USCGC Achushnet ( United States Coast Guard)

=== 21 September ===
List of shipwrecks: 21 September 1921
Ship	State	Description
Palestine	(France) Tunisia	The brig was in collision with Clan Colquhoun (United Kingdom at Valletta, Malta and sank. All on board were rescued.

=== 22 September ===
List of shipwrecks: 22 September 1921
Ship	State	Description
Salina	Norway	The cargo ship collided with Jan Breydel (Belgium) in the English Channel between the East Goodwin and South Goodwin Lightships (both United Kingdom) and sank with the loss of fourteen of her 25 crew. Survivors were rescued by Jan Breydel.

=== 26 September ===
List of shipwrecks: 26 September 1921
Ship	State	Description
Columbia River	United States	The schooner was wrecked on Sunday Island, Queensland, Australia. Her crew survived.
Ingeborg	Sweden	The schooner was driven ashore at Kumnaes and was wrecked. Her crew survived.
USS R-6	United States Navy	The R-class submarine sank at San Pedro, California. She was refloated on 13 October. Subsequently repaired and returned to service.
Seifuku Maru	Japan	The cargo ship was wrecked on this date.

=== 27 September ===
List of shipwrecks: 27 September 1923
Ship	State	Description
USS Alabama	United States Navy	USS Alabama struck by a bomb on 23 September 1921 while in use as a target ship. The decommissioned Illinois-class battleship sank in the Chesapeake Bay after use as a target from 23 to 25 September by aircraft of the 1st Provisional Air Brigade ( United States Army Air Service).

=== 28 September ===
List of shipwrecks: 28 September 1921
Ship	State	Description
Lambaness	United Kingdom	The cargo ship ran aground at Land's End, Cornwall. Her crew were rescued by the Sennen Lifeboat.
Rigmor	Denmark	The schooner ran aground at Akureyri, Iceland, and was wrecked. Her crew survived.

=== 29 September ===
List of shipwrecks: 29 September 1921
Ship	State	Description
Hedvig	Sweden	The auxiliary schooner caught fire at Amsterdam, Netherlands and was scuttled.

=== 30 September ===
List of shipwrecks: 30 September 1921
Ship	State	Description
Rusamet No. 4	Ottoman Navy	The guard ship was lost on this date.

=== Unknown date ===
List of shipwrecks: Unknown September 1921
Ship	State	Description
Meridian	United Kingdom	The ketch went aground on the Smalls Rocks off Pembrokeshire in dense fog on 13 September or 19 September 1920 or 1921. She was abandoned by her crew who were rescued by the trawler William Hanbury (United Kingdom) on either 14 or 20 September. She floated off the rocks and drifted nearly 100 kilometres (62 mi), crossing St. Georges Channel in two days and had been driven ashore, about 3.2 kilometres (2 mi) north of Carnsore Point, Ireland, on 15 or 21 September, becoming a total loss.

== October ==
=== 2 October ===
List of shipwrecks: 2 October 1921
Ship	State	Description
Tanana	United States	During a voyage in the Territory of Alaska from Fairbanks to Tolovana with 21 crewmen but no passengers or cargo aboard, the 495-gross register ton, 149.6-foot (45.6 m) passenger ship – a sternwheel paddle steamer – struck a submerged snag on the Tanana River 1 mile (1.6 km) above Minto, turned toward shore to beach herself before she could sink in deep water, and sank in 6 feet (1.8 m) of water. Salvage was impossible in 1921 due to the imminent onset of winter, and by the time the weather began to moderate in the spring of 1922 she was beyond economical repair, so she was stripped of her machinery and equipment and abandoned.
Triton	Denmark	The cargo ship ran aground at Gosvarosen, Norway and sank.

=== 3 October ===
List of shipwrecks: 3 October 1921
Ship	State	Description
Corona	Peru	The sailing ship foundered. Her crew were rescued.

=== 4 October ===
List of shipwrecks: 4 October 1921
Ship	State	Description
Rokko Maru	Japan	The cargo ship foundered off Hamashima.

=== 5 October ===
List of shipwrecks: 5 October 1921
Ship	State	Description
Gavina	United Kingdom	The 130.2-foot (39.7 m), 289-ton steam trawler ran aground on a reef in a dense fog and sank in 6 metres (20 ft) of water 300 metres (980 ft) north of Bruce's Castle, Ruthin Island, County Antrim, Ireland, United Kingdom.
Glauco	Italy	The schooner caught fire in the Atlantic Ocean and was abandoned (approximately 21°N 75°W).
J. T. Robinson	United States	While departing the Ahrnklin River bound for Yakutat, Territory of Alaska, the 18-gross register ton, motor vessel sank with the loss of five lives while attempting to cross the Ahrnklin River Bar (59°25′45″N 139°32′20″W) on the coast of Southcentral Alaska in bad weather.
Marie	Germany	The schooner foundered in the North Sea 25 nautical miles (46 km) off Hanstholm, Denmark.

=== 7 October ===
List of shipwrecks: 7 October 1921
Ship	State	Description
USS Herreshoff No. 321	United States Navy	The patrol vessel sank in the Pacific Ocean off California whilst under tow by USS Nitro (United States Navy).
Imprimus	United Kingdom	The schooner was abandoned in the Atlantic Ocean. Her crew were rescued by Hartfield (United Kingdom).

=== 8 October ===
List of shipwrecks: 8 October 1921
Ship	State	Description
Protector	United Kingdom	The schooner came ashore at Lamaline, Newfoundland and was wrecked.
Rowan	United Kingdom	The passenger ship was rammed from astern by West Camak (United States) in fog in the North Channel. Her passengers were mustered on deck. Clan Malcolm (United Kingdom) then rammed her from starboard and cut her in two. Rowan sank with the loss of 22 of the 97 people on board. Survivors were rescued by Clan Malcolm, West Camak and HMS Wrestler (Royal Navy).

=== 9 October ===
List of shipwrecks: 9 October 1921
Ship	State	Description
Margery Mahaffy	United Kingdom	The schooner was wrecked in Trepassey Bay. Her crew were rescued,

=== 11 October ===
List of shipwrecks: 11 October 1921
Ship	State	Description
Lenape	United States	The passenger/cargo ship sank in the Hudson River at Pier 36, New York City due to the seacocks being left open. The vessel was raised, repaired and returned to service.

=== 12 October ===
List of shipwrecks: 12 October 1921
Ship	State	Description
Cocanada	United Kingdom	The cargo ship was driven ashore at Gopalpur, Orissa, India. She was refloated on 23 October.

=== 13 October ===
List of shipwrecks: 13 October 1921
Ship	State	Description
Luis Urquijo	Spain	The cargo ship caught fire at Valencia and was beached.
Royal	Norway	The cargo ship ran aground at Mistaken Point, Newfoundland. Her crew were rescued.

=== 14 October ===
List of shipwrecks: 14 October 1921
Ship	State	Description
Lasristan	United Kingdom	The cargo ship ran aground in the Maasvlakte, Netherlands. She was refloated on 17 October.
Maplefield	United Kingdom	The schooner sprang a leak in the Atlantic Ocean and was abandoned (27°48′N 79°43′W). Her crew were rescued by Ulua (United Kingdom). She was towed in to Cumberland Sound by USCGC Yamacraw ( United States Coast Guard).

=== 15 October ===
List of shipwrecks: 15 October 1921
Ship	State	Description
Araminta	United Kingdom	The schooner ran aground and capsized at St. John's, Newfoundland.
Hakodate Maru	Japan	The cargo ship ran aground off Rebun Island, Hokkaidō. She was refloated but found to be leaking and was beached.
Signal	Finland	The auxiliary schooner was driven ashore at Agger, Denmark and was wrecked.

=== 16 October ===
List of shipwrecks: 16 October 1921
Ship	State	Description
Thérese Marie	France	The sailing ship foundered in the Atlantic Ocean. Her crew were rescued.

=== 17 October ===
List of shipwrecks: 17 October 1921
Ship	State	Description
Frank Billings	United States	During a voyage from Toledo, Ohio, to Green Bay, Wisconsin, with a cargo of soft coal, the bulk carrier went ashore on the coast of Wisconsin in Sand Bay, part of Green Bay, in Door County 3 miles (4.8 km) south of Sherwood Point. After removal of some of her cargo to lighten her, she was refloated on 22 October and returned to service.
Glaieul	France	The cargo liner sprang a leak and foundered off Opobo, Nigeria. All on board were rescued.

=== 19 October ===
List of shipwrecks: 19 October 1921
Ship	State	Description
Advance	United States	While unloading soft coal, from the bulk carrier Frank Billings (United States) — which was stranded on the coast of Wisconsin in Sand Bay, part of Green Bay, in Door County 3 miles (4.8 km) south of Sherwood Point – in an effort to lighten Frank Billings so she could be refloated, the 139-foot (42 m), 366-gross register ton barge began to take on water in high winds and heavy seas, was cut loose from Frank Billings, and drifted ashore. The United States Coast Guard rescued Advance's five-man crew, but she was pounded to pieces by the surf. Her wreck lies in 8 feet (2.4 m) of water at 44°51.803′N 087°29.817′W, 560 feet (170 m) off the eastern shore of Sand Bay Peninsula, with a 40-foot (12 m) section of her hull located approximately 75 feet (23 m) east of the main wreck site.
San Miguel	Uruguay	The cargo ship caught fire in the Atlantic Ocean and was abandoned. She was towed into Maldonado by Golto Nuevo (Uruguay and beached.
Snipe	United Kingdom	The 119.1-foot (36.3 m), 166-ton steam trawler was sunk in a collision with Burmah (Flag unknown) in the North Sea.

=== 20 October ===
List of shipwrecks: 20 October 1921
Ship	State	Description
Eugenia	Italy	The cargo ship sprang a leak and sank in the Tyrrhenian Sea off Ischia.
Santa Rita	United States	The cargo ship departed New Orleans, Louisiana for an Italian port on this date. She was last reported off Key West, Florida. Presumed foundered in the Atlantic Ocean with the loss of all hands.

=== 21 October ===
List of shipwrecks: 21 October 1921
Ship	State	Description
John Casewell	United Kingdom	The 125.7-foot (38.3 m), 278-ton steam trawler, a former Castle-class naval trawler, ran aground and became a total loss on Dog Rocks at the east end of Bere Island, Castletownbere, County Cork, United Kingdom.

=== 23 October ===
List of shipwrecks: 23 October 1921
Ship	State	Description
Gunnel	Sweden	The cargo ship caught fire in the Baltic Sea and was beached on Öland, Sweden. Her crew were rescued.
Vendis	United Kingdom	The cargo ship was driven ashore at Huntcliff, Yorkshire. Her crew were rescued. She was refloated on 14 November.

=== 24 October ===
List of shipwrecks: 24 October 1921
Ship	State	Description
Cavehill	United Kingdom	The cargo ship sprang a leak and sank in the North Sea with the loss of two lives. Survivors were rescued by the trawlers Cayrian, Cetus, Evergreen, and Lombard.
Elizabeth	Germany	The three-masted schooner ran aground off Vlieland, Friesland, the Netherlands and was wrecked.
Welsh Belle	United Kingdom	The schooner was driven ashore at Caister-on-Sea, Norfolk. Her crew were rescued.

=== 25 October ===
List of shipwrecks: 25 October 1921
Ship	State	Description
David Evans	flag unknown	The sailing ship was destroyed by fire at Dilhi, Timor, Netherlands East Indies.
Nordica	United Kingdom	The schooner was driven ashore at Pointe d'Arco, Corsica, France. Her crew were rescued. She was a total loss.
Thames	United States	The wood steam cargo barge sank 14 N.M. north of Jupiter Inlet, Florida.

=== 26 October ===
List of shipwrecks: 26 October 1921
Ship	State	Description
F. D. Asche	United States	The tanker ran aground on Stranger Reef in the Bahamas eventually grinding her way one mile (1.6 km) to Manatilla Reef where she stuck, sinking in 5 1/2 fathoms (33 ft; 10.1 m) of water. Refloated later and towed to New York, repaired and returned to service.

=== 27 October ===
List of shipwrecks: 27 October 1921
Ship	State	Description
Alta	United States	The halibut fishing vessel was wrecked on False Island in Clarence Strait in the Alexander Archipelago in Southeast Alaska during a storm.
Fukui Maru	Japan	The passenger ship foundered in the Pacific Ocean 340 nautical miles (630 km) off Cape Flattery, Washington, United States. All on board were rescued.
India	Portugal	The cargo ship caught fire at Lisbon. She was a total loss.
Mallard	United States	The halibut fishing vessel was wrecked on False Island in Clarence Strait in the Alexander Archipelago in Southeast Alaska while trying to assist the stranded halibut-fishing vessel Alta (United States) during a storm.
Rhenania	Germany	The cargo ship collided with Helene Russ (Germany) in the Skaggerak off Gedser, Denmark and was beached. Her crew were rescued. She was refloated on 13 November.
Thames	United States	The cargo ship sprang a leak and sank at Jacksonville, Florida.

=== 28 October ===
List of shipwrecks: 28 October 1921
Ship	State	Description
Chile	Italy	The ocean liner struck a mine and sank in the Cerrigo Channel. Her crew survived.
Margaret	United Kingdom	The cargo ship foundered in Montrose Bay. Her crew survived.
West Point	United States	During a gale with heavy seas, the 19-gross register ton, 44-foot (13 m) fishing vessel broke loose from her dock at Quadra Cannery in Boca de Quadra in Southeast Alaska with no one on board, drifted 8 nautical miles (15 km; 9.2 mi) away, and sank.

=== 31 October ===
List of shipwrecks: 31 October 1921
Ship	State	Description
Dersingham	Mauritius	The brig, which was on a voyage from Singapore to Port Louis was in communication with The Gardner Williams (United Kingdom) on this date. No further trace, presumed foundered in the Indian Ocean with the loss of all hands.
Skrymer	Norway	The cargo ship ran aground in the Vatlestraumen, off Bergen, Norway. She was refloated on 4 November.

=== Unknown date ===
List of shipwrecks: Unknown date October 1921
Ship	State	Description
Swiftsure	United States	The 32-gross register ton, 54-foot (16 m) fishing vessel sank on 5 or 6 October during a storm in the Gulf of Alaska 50 nautical miles (93 km; 58 mi) off Yakutat, Territory of Alaska, with the loss of her entire crew of six men.

== November ==
=== 1 November ===
List of shipwrecks: 1 November 1921
Ship	State	Description
Imogene	United Kingdom	The auxiliary sailing ship ran aground on The Needles, Isle of Wight. Her crew were rescued by the Totland Lifeboat, She broke up and was a total loss.

=== 2 November ===
List of shipwrecks: 2 November 1921
Ship	State	Description
Bellgrove	Sweden	The cargo ship foundered in the North Sea off Lønstrup, Denmark with the loss of fifteen of her nineteen crew.
Député Raoul Briquet	France	The cargo ship capsized and sank in the Thames Estuary (54°05′N 1°17′E) with the loss of one of her 28 crew. Survivors were rescued by the trawlers Belmont and King Frederick III (both United Kingdom).
Earl Grey	Newfoundland	The schooner was wrecked in Bonavista Bay.
Standard Cull	United Kingdom	The schooner ran aground at King's Cove, Newfoundland and was a total loss.

=== 3 November ===
List of shipwrecks: 3 November 1921
Ship	State	Description
Carrier Dove	United States	The four-masted schooner struck a reef off Molokai, Hawaii, and sank.
Rosa Belle	United States	The schooner capsized in Lake Michigan with the loss of her crew. She was towed into Milwaukee, Wisconsin.

=== 4 November ===
List of shipwrecks: 4 November 1921
Ship	State	Description
Député Gaston Dumesnil	France	The cargo ship departed Penarth, Glamorgan, United Kingdom for Rouen, Seine-Inférieure. She later foundered in the Bristol Channel. The bodies of six of her crew washed up on the north coast of Cornwall.

=== 5 November ===
List of shipwrecks: 5 November 1921
Ship	State	Description
James Jones Dale	United Kingdom	The schooner was driven ashore and wrecked at Seldom Comeby, Newfoundland.

=== 6 November ===
List of shipwrecks: 6 November 1921
Ship	State	Description
Angus	United Kingdom	The coaster was in a collision with Louis Nall (France) in the English Channel off Le Havre, Seine-Inférieure, France and sank. All eleven crew were rescued.
Daitoku Maru	Japan	The ship was damaged in a collision with Tsurugisaki (Imperial Japanese Navy) and capsized three nautical miles (5.6 km; 3.5 mi) off Ominasejima. She was towed by Tsurugisaki to Kodomari Bay where she was beached at Sadanomi, Yashirojima.
Kyle Firth	United Kingdom	The cargo ship ran aground near Hunstanton, Norfolk. She was refloated on 1 December.
Midsland	Belgium	The cargo ship was driven ashore at Heyst. Her crew were rescued.
New York Maru	Japan	The cargo ship ran aground on the Bombay Reef, Paracel Islands. Her crew were rescued by Gozan Maru (Japan) on 17 November and she was declared a total loss.

=== 7 November ===
List of shipwrecks: 7 November 1921
Ship	State	Description
Alf	Norway	The cargo ship foundered in the North Sea 60 nautical miles (110 km) north of Lowestoft, Suffolk, United Kingdom with the loss of sixteen of her eighteen crew. Survivors were rescued by the trawler Laureate (United Kingdom).
Clintonia	United Kingdom	The schooner was dismasted in the Atlantic Ocean off the coast of Newfoundland and was abandoned. Her crew were rescued by Jean Wakeley (United Kingdom).
Singleton Palmer	United States	The schooner collided with Apache (United States) in the Atlantic Ocean 10 nautical miles (19 km) off the Fenwick Island Lightship (United States Coast Guard). She was abandoned with the loss of a crew member.
Walhalla	France	The cargo ship ran aground off Vlissingen, Netherlands. Her crew were rescued.

=== 9 November ===
List of shipwrecks: 9 November 1921
Ship	State	Description
Mensabe	Colombia	The cargo ship sank whilst on a voyage from Panama City, Colombia to Buenaventura with the loss of seven of her eighteen crew.

=== 11 November ===
List of shipwrecks: 11 November 1921
Ship	State	Description
Kaleva	Sweden	The schooner was driven ashore at Deal, Kent United Kingdom. Her crew were rescued. She was a total loss.
Rex	Finland	The auxiliary sailing ship was lost on this date.
Walhalla	France	The cargo ship ran aground at Rotterdam, Netherlands. She was refloated on 20 November.

=== 13 November ===
List of shipwrecks: 13 November 1921
Ship	State	Description
Elpis	Greece	The cargo ship ran aground off Conejera, Balearic Islands, Spain. Her crew were rescued. She was declared a total loss.

=== 14 November ===
List of shipwrecks: 14 November 1921
Ship	State	Description
Nevis	United Kingdom	The sailing ship ran aground on Cabrera, Balearic Islands, Spain and was wrecked. Her crew were rescued.
Perth	United Kingdom	The cargo ship came ashore at Greymouth, South Island, New Zealand and was wrecked.

=== 15 November ===
List of shipwrecks: 15 November 1921
Ship	State	Description
City of New York	Canada	The steamer sank in Lake Ontario.
Dove	United Kingdom	The schooner was wrecked on Fogo Island, Newfoundland.

=== 17 November ===
List of shipwrecks: 17 November 1921
Ship	State	Description
Poolena	United Kingdom	The cargo ship (Llanelly for Cork, with coal) struck submerged wreckage in the Bristol Channel 5 nautical miles (9.3 km) southeast of Mine Head Lighthouse, County Waterford, Ireland and sank. Her crew reached shore in the ship's boats.

=== 18 November ===
List of shipwrecks: 18 November 1921
Ship	State	Description
Sintram	Unknown	The five-masted schooner was rammed and sunk by the 10,000 DWT tanker David McKelvy of the Tide Water Oil Company off Cape Cod with no loss of life.

=== 20 November ===
List of shipwrecks: 20 November 1921
Ship	State	Description
Evelyn G	United States	The 13-gross register ton motor vessel was wrecked at Point Arden (58°09′30″N 134°10′30″W) in Stephens Passage in the Alexander Archipelago in Southeast Alaska after her gasoline engine broke down and she drifted ashore. Her crew of two survived.
Ferm	United Kingdom	The cargo ship was wrecked at St. Shott's, Newfoundland. Her crew were rescued.
Sea Eagle	United States	The tug foundered in a storm off Yaquina Head, lost with all nine crew.

=== 21 November ===
List of shipwrecks: 21 November 1921
Ship	State	Description
San Francisco	United States	The cargo ship caught fire at New York and was beached.

=== 23 November ===
List of shipwrecks: 23 November 1921
Ship	State	Description
Faithful	United Kingdom	The schooner came ashore at Carrick Head, Cornwall. Her crew were rescued.

=== 24 November ===
List of shipwrecks: 24 November 1921
Ship	State	Description
City of New York	flag unknown	The cargo ship foundered 10 nautical miles (19 km) off Stony Point, New York United States with the loss of nine lives.
Florentina	Spain	The cargo ship caught fire at Valencia. She was towed out of port and beached. She broke in two and was declared a total loss.

=== 25 November ===
List of shipwrecks: 25 November 1921
Ship	State	Description
Fountains Abbey	United Kingdom	The cargo ship ran aground at Red Head, Forfarshire. Her crew were rescued.

=== 28 November ===
List of shipwrecks: 28 November 1921
Ship	State	Description
Carrie Clark	United States	The barge foundered in a gale and fog between Barnegat, New Jersey and Sandy Hook.
Governor Robie	United States	The barge foundered in a gale and fog between Barnegat, New Jersey and Sandy Hook.
Losna	Norway	The cargo liner came ashore 20 nautical miles (37 km) east of the mouth of the Great Fish River, South Africa. All on board were rescued. She was abandoned as a total loss on 5 December.
Sylvanus	United States	The 281-foot (85.6 m) schooner barge sank in 85 feet (26 m) of water in the North Atlantic Ocean off New Jersey during a storm.
Vogue	United Kingdom	The schooner sprang a leak and was abandoned with the loss of a crew member. The survivors were rescued.

=== 29 November ===
List of shipwrecks: 29 November 1921
Ship	State	Description
Angheliki Samathraky	Greece	The cargo ship caught fire in the Black Sea and was beached 12 nautical miles (22 km) east of Varna, Romania.
NRP Cávado	Portuguese Navy	While under tow to Lisbon, Portugal, by the tug NRP Patrão Lopes (Portuguese Navy) as a war reparatiion, the torpedo boat — formerly 88 F C (Austro-Hungarian Navy) — parted her tow cable and sank in a storm in the Mediterranean Sea off Morocco. No one was aboard.
Industry	United Kingdom	The schooner was wrecked in Nethertown Bay.
June	United Kingdom	The schooner caught fire in the Mediterranean Sea off Mahón, Menorca, in the Balearic Islands and was abandoned. Her crew survived.
NRP Zêzere	Portuguese Navy	While under tow to Lisbon, Portugal, by the tug NRP Patrão Lopes (Portuguese Navy) as a war reparatiion, the torpedo boat — formerly 85 F Z (Austro-Hungarian Navy) — parted her tow cable and sank in a storm in the Mediterranean Sea off Morocco. No one was aboard.

=== 30 November ===
List of shipwrecks: 30 November 1921
Ship	State	Description
Guvernøren	Norway	The tanker ran aground in 2 nautical miles (3.7 km) off Cape Carysfort, Falkland Islands. She was abandoned as a total loss on 3 December.
Tibet	France	The cargo ship ran aground in the Bosphorus. She was refloated on 4 December.

=== Unknown date ===
List of shipwrecks: Unknown date 1921
Ship	State	Description
Nina Lee	United Kingdom	The schooner was lost on a voyage from Greece to Newfoundland. Her crew were rescued.
Yannakis	Greece	The steamship, travelling in ballast from Rouen to Fowey, stranded on the eastern side of Praa Sands. Driven further ashore by successive gales, she was refloated in January 1922 by The Lady of the Isles and Greencastle of the Little Western Salvage Company.

== December ==
=== 1 December ===
List of shipwrecks: 1 December 1921
Ship	State	Description
Comer	United Kingdom	The coaster foundered in the Firth of Forth. Her crew were rescued by a tug.
USS DeLong	United States Navy	DeLong The Wickes-class destroyer destroyer ran aground in Half Moon Bay, California. She was salvaged, decommissioned, and scrapped.

=== 2 December ===
List of shipwrecks: 2 December 1921
Ship	State	Description
Cromwell	United Kingdom	The cargo ship ran aground at Brest, Finistère, France and was beached. She was refloated on 3 December.
Dingle	United Kingdom	The cargo ship ran aground on Rathlin Island, County Antrim. She was declared a total loss on 12 December.
Stanley Joseph	United Kingdom	The schooner foundered on this date. Five crew were rescued by Welshman (United Kingdom).

=== 3 December ===
List of shipwrecks: 3 December 1921
Ship	State	Description
Janna	Norway	The barque departed Sydney, New South Wales, Australia for Falmouth, Cornwall, United Kingdom. No further trace, presumed foundered with the loss of all hands.
Lila Boutilier	United Kingdom	The schooner caught fire in the Atlantic Ocean (40°09′N 10°49′W) and was abandoned. Her crew were rescued by Ariadne (France).

=== 4 December ===
List of shipwrecks: 4 December 1921
Ship	State	Description
Algeria	United Kingdom	The schooner foundered in the Indian Ocean 600 nautical miles (1,100 km) south of Colombo, Ceylon. Her crew were rescued by Texel (Netherlands).

=== 5 December ===
List of shipwrecks: 5 December 1921
Ship	State	Description
Aurore	France	The ship foundered in the English Channel off Honfleur, Calvados. Her crew were rescued.
Elwy	United Kingdom	The cargo ship ran aground at Breaksea Point, Glamorgan. She was refloated on 13 December.
Heimdal	Norway	The mailboat ran aground at Rønne, Bornholm, Denmark. All on board were rescued.
Kinsman	United Kingdom	The schooner sprang a leak and was abandoned off Santa Maria Island, Azores, Portugal. Her crew were rescued by Gil Eanes (Portugal).

=== 7 December ===
List of shipwrecks: 7 December 1921
Ship	State	Description
Amy B. Silver	United Kingdom	The schooner was abandoned in the Atlantic Ocean. Her crew were rescued by Sophie Rickmer (Germany).
Hornsee	United Kingdom	The cargo ship caught fire and sank in the Mediterranean Sea whilst on a voyage from Syracuse, Sicily, Italy to Alexandria, Egypt. Her crew were rescued. Barratry was suspected to be the cause of her loss.
Ruby W	United Kingdom	The schooner was abandoned and set afire in the Atlantic Ocean 400 nautical miles (740 km) south of Cape Race, Newfoundland. Her crew were rescued.
USS S-48	United States Navy	USS S-48 The S-class submarine sank off Penfield Reef in Long Island Sound during pre-commissioning builder's trails. All aboard survived by bringing her bow to the surface and escaping via one of her torpedo tubes. She was refloated on 20 December, repaired, and commissioned in 1922.

=== 8 December ===
List of shipwrecks: 8 December 1921
Ship	State	Description
Azeus	United Kingdom	The cargo ship ran aground at Alberoni, near Venice, Italy. She was refloated on 12 December.

=== 9 December ===
List of shipwrecks: 9 December 1921
Ship	State	Description
Saaremaa	Estonia	The cargo ship collided with another vessel off Kronstadt, Soviet Union and sank with the loss of 23 lives.

=== 10 December ===
List of shipwrecks: 10 December 1921
Ship	State	Description
Celtic II	Norway	The coaster was destroyed by fire at Arendal, Norway. Her crew were rescued.
Drummer's Tax	United Kingdom	The schooner was driven ashore at Bonavista, Newfoundland and was wrecked.

=== 12 December ===
List of shipwrecks: 12 December 1921
Ship	State	Description
Blue Peter	United States	The schooner caught fire in the Atlantic Ocean off Maldonado, Uruguay and was abandoned.

=== 13 December ===
List of shipwrecks: 13 December 1921
Ship	State	Description
Inishboffin	United Kingdom	The cargo ship ran aground on Aegna, Estonia. She was abandoned by her crew on 14 December.
Otis	Sweden	The cargo ship came ashore, but was refloated and beached at Hönö, Sweden.

=== 14 December ===
List of shipwrecks: 14 December 1921
Ship	State	Description
Flevo 4	United Kingdom	The coaster struck submerged wreckaged in the English Channel and foundered 9 nautical miles (17 km) west south west of the Royal Sovereign Lightship (United Kingdom). Her crew were rescued byb Scuttle (United Kingdom).
Jacov Sverdlov	United Kingdom	The cargo ship came ashore near Lübeck, Schleswig-Holstein, Germany. She was refloated on 17 December.
Kathleen Lily	United Kingdom	The cargo ship ran aground at Helsinki, Finland and was abandoned.
Tarv	United Kingdom	The cargo ship was abandoned in the Irish Sea off Rathlin Island, County Antrim. She drifted ashore and was wrecked. She was declared a total loss on 1 February.

=== 15 December ===
List of shipwrecks: 15 December 1921
Ship	State	Description
Silba	United Kingdom	The coaster departed Seaham, County Durham for Lerwick, Shetland Islands. No further trace, presumed foundered in the North Sea with the loss of all hands.

=== 16 December ===
List of shipwrecks: 16 December 1921
Ship	State	Description
Stevenstone	United Kingdom	The cargo ship departed Blyth, Northumberland for Helsingør, Denmark. No further trace presumed foundered with the loss of all hands.
Tsushima Maru	Japan	The cargo liner ran aground in the Hirado Strait. All on board were rescued.

=== 19 December ===
List of shipwrecks: 19 December 1921
Ship	State	Description
Capella	Germany	The cargo ship foundered in the Baltic Sea. Her crew were rescued by Lenin (Soviet Union).
Donald J. Cook	United Kingdom	The schooner was abandoned in the Gulf of Mexico. Her crew were rescued by San Eduardo (United Kingdom).

=== 21 December ===
List of shipwrecks: 21 December 1921
Ship	State	Description
Alda	Norway	The schooner was crushed in pack ice and sank at Burnt Church, New Brunswick, Canada.
Mary Annie	United Kingdom	The cargo ship foundered in the North Sea. Her crew were rescued by Wigbert (Germany).

=== 24 December ===
List of shipwrecks: 24 December 1921
Ship	State	Description
Bushu Maru	Japan	The cargo ship departed Dalny, China for Takao, Formosa. Presumed subsequently foundered with the loss of all hands. Wreckage from the ship washed up on the Pescadores in mid-January 1922.
Katharina	flag unknown	The ship sprang a leak and was abandoned in the North Sea 28 nautical miles (52 km) off the Noord Hinder Lightship (Netherlands).
Totem	United States	The 12-gross register ton, 46-foot (14 m) passenger vessel disappeared in the Gulf of Alaska with the loss of all three people on board after departing Katalla, Territory of Alaska. One witness claimed to have seen her sink on 7 January 1922 off of Yakutat, Territory of Alaska.

=== 25 December ===
List of shipwrecks: 25 December 1921
Ship	State	Description
Atherton	United Kingdom	The cargo ship capsized in the Thames Estuary near the Girdlers Lightship (United Kingdom). Her crew were rescued by Falcon (United Kingdom) before she sank.
Paz de Epalza	Spain	The cargo ship ran aground in the Hormigas Islands and was a total loss. Her crew were rescued.

=== 26 December ===
List of shipwrecks: 26 December 1921
Ship	State	Description
Charles	France	The schooner collided with the Noord Hinder Lightship (Netherlands) and sank. Her crew were rescued by the lightship.

=== 27 December ===
List of shipwrecks: 27 December 1921
Ship	State	Description
Yannakis	Greece	The cargo ship was stranded on the eastern side of Praa Sands, Cornwall, United Kingdom. She was driven further ashore by successive gales. Yannakis was refloated in January 1922 and towed to Penzance by the salvage vessels The Lady and Greencastle (both United Kingdom).

=== 28 December ===
List of shipwrecks: 28 December 1921
Ship	State	Description
NRP Covado and NRP Zazere	Portuguese Navy	The Zezere-class torpedo boats were wrecked on Cape Bon while being delivered to Portugal from Austria-Hungary as war reparations.
Grubstake	United States	The 14-gross register ton motor vessel ran aground 3 nautical miles (5.6 km) south of Smugglers Cove (55°37′N 131°53′W) on Revillagigedo Island in the Alexander Archipelago in Southeast Alaska. The two people on board survived. She broke up on 29 December.
Joseph Hodgkins	United Kingdom	The 125-foot (38 m), 276-ton steam trawler, a former Castle-class naval trawler, sank in a collision with the trawler Curiasse (United Kingdom) off Maughold Head, Isle of Man in a Force 8 gale. Crew rescued by trawler "Jacinta" (United Kingdom).
Karitane	United Kingdom	The cargo ship ran aground on Deal Island, Tasmania, Australia, and was wrecked.

=== 30 December ===
List of shipwrecks: 30 December 1921
Ship	State	Description
SS Adderstone	United Kingdom	The cargo ship departed from the River Tyne for Hamburg, Germany. No further trace, presumed foundered in the North Sea with the loss of all 19 crew.
Klampenborg	Denmark	The cargo ship departed Danzig for Køge, Sjælland. No further trace, presumed foundered in the Baltic Sea with the loss of all hands.
Lennox	United Kingdom	The auxiliary schooner foundered in the Irish Sea. Her six crew were rescued by the Wicklow Lifeboat.
HMS Prince George	Royal Navy	The decommissioned battleship was wrecked in the North Sea off Camperduin, the Netherlands, at (52°44′05″N 004°38′23″E) while on her way to be scrapped in Germany.

=== 31 December ===
List of shipwrecks: 31 December 1921
Ship	State	Description
Record Reign	United Kingdom	The schooner was wrecked in the Nieuwe Diep, Amsterdam, Netherlands.

== Unknown date ==
List of shipwrecks: Unknown date 1921
Ship	State	Description
Equity	United Kingdom	The cargo ship grounded and sank during a passage from Jersey, Channel Islands, to Goole, Yorkshire, England. She later was raised, repaired, and returned to service.
Minto	United States	The sternwheel paddle steamer was lost on the Yukon River in the Territory of Alaska.
Rüsumat No 4	Turkish Navy	The military transport ship was shelled and sunk by Greek warships off Samsun, Turkey.
Sesnon #4	United States	The barge was lost at Bluff, Territory of Alaska, in 1921 or 1924.
U-86	United Kingdom	The Type U 81 submarine foundered in the English Channel.
UB-122	United Kingdom	The Type UB III submarine foundered in the North Sea off the east coast of England.
