= Nelson Ommanney =

Royal Navy Admiral; Admiral Superintendent Chatham Dockyard (1854–1938)

Admiral Sir Nelson Ommanney KBE CB
- Born: Robert Nelson Ommanney; January 31, 1854
- Died: January 12, 1938 (age 83); Parkstone, Dorset, England
- Military career
- Allegiance: United Kingdom
- Branch: Royal Navy
- Rank: Admiral
- Commands: HMS Europa (1903); HMS Andromeda (1904–1906); HMS Britannia (1906–1907); Devonport Dockyard (1907–1908); Chatham Dockyard (1909–1912)
- Awards: KBE; CB

Admiral Sir Robert Nelson Ommanney KBE CB (January 31, 1854 – January 12, 1938) was a British admiral who served in the Royal Navy. His service included commanding a cruiser on the China station during the Russo-Japanese War, Admiral Superintendent of the Chatham Dockyard and on special assignment in the Admiralty during World War I.

== Early life ==
Ommanney was born into a naval family. Several of his relatives were also admirals of the Royal Navy.

== Naval career ==
Ommanney joined the Royal Navy two days short of his fourteenth birthday, on January 29, 1868. He was appointed lieutenant in 1878, commander in 1893, and captain in 1899. Ommanney was appointed rear-admiral in 1908 and vice-admiral in 1913. In 1915, he was placed on the retired list at his own request. He was appointed admiral on the retired list in 1917.

He had a varied career with the Royal Navy. In the 1870s, he was involved in the suppression of the slave trade in the Red Sea, Persian Gulf and off the east coast of Africa.

Ommanney was captain of HMS Europa, a cruiser of the Diadem class, for half a year in early 1903. In 1904, he was appointed captain of HMS Andromeda, another Diadem class cruiser, and sailed for the China Station. He served in that capacity during the Russo-Japanese War. He was the first captain of the battleship, HMS Britannia, from 1906 to 1907.

From 1907 to 1908, he was Captain of the Devonport Dockyard, and from 1909 to 1912, he was the Admiral Superintendent of the Chatham Dockyard on the River Medway in Kent.

During World War I, Ommanney held a special office at the Admiralty. In 1915, the First Sea Lord, Admiral Jackie Fisher wrote to Winston Churchill, at that point First Lord of the Admiralty: "We have struck oil in Admiral Ommanney. Oliver tells me he knows more abt handling a Fleet than anyone in the Navy! Why is he not in a Battle Squadron then? Put him in place of Warrender—Warrender to Greenwich—Bayly to Monitors—Jerram to Mines like Ommanney—let those ideas germinate!"

Ommanney was knighted in the New Years Honours of 1919 for his war service with the Admiralty.

== Nautical assessor ==
Ommanney was appointed to act as a nautical assessor to assist courts dealing with admiralty issues. The role of a nautical assessor is to provide expert advice on matters of nautical skill and seamanship. For example, he acted as one of two nautical assessors in the hearing by the Judicial Committee of the Privy Council into the collision in the Halifax harbour which led to the Halifax Explosion in 1917.

== Death ==
Ommanney died on January 12, 1938, at Parkstone, Dorset, nineteen days short of his 84th birthday, and seventeen days short of the 70th anniversary of entering the Royal Navy.

== Honours ==
- Admiralty commendation for his hydrographic work while on the China Station
- Companion of the Order of the Bath, 1912
- Knight Commander of the Order of the British Empire

== Works ==
R.N. Ommanney, Notes on the Management of Ships in a Fleet
