= SS Leonita =

Leonita was the name of two steamships operated by José Luis de Ansoleaga.

- SS Leonita (1890), 1,850 GRT cargo vessel sunk in March 1918 northwest off Marettimo by U-35.
- SS Leonita (1919), 3,545 GRT cargo vessel foundered in March 1921 west off Gibraltar.
