= Admiral Ommanney =

Admiral Ommanney may refer to:

- Erasmus Ommanney (1814–1904), British Royal Navy admiral
- John Ommanney (1773–1855), British Royal Navy admiral
- Robert Nelson Ommanney (1854–1938), British Royal Navy vice admiral
