= HMS Spartiate (1898) =

Diadem-class cruiser

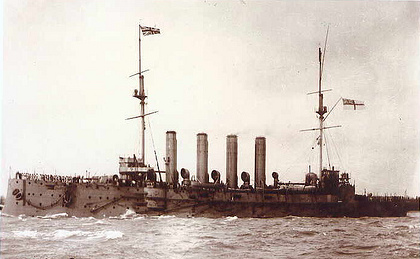
- HMS Spartiate

History

United Kingdom
- Name: HMS Spartiate
- Builder: Pembroke Dockyard
- Laid down: 10 May 1897
- Launched: 27 October 1898
- Christened: Mrs. Burges Watson
- Renamed: Fisgard, June 1915
- Fate: Sold July 1932

General characteristics
- Class & type: Diadem-class cruiser
- Displacement: 11,000 tons
- Length: 435 ft (133 m) (462 ft 6 in (140.97 m) o/a)
- Beam: 69 ft (21 m)
- Draught: 25 ft 6 in (7.77 m)
- Propulsion: 2 shaft triple expansion engines; 16.500 - 18,000 hp
- Speed: 20–20.5 kn (37.0–38.0 km/h; 23.0–23.6 mph)
- Complement: 760
- Armament: 16 × single QF 6-inch (152 mm) guns; 14 × single QF 12-pounder (76 mm) 12 cwt guns; 3 × single QF 3-pounder (47 mm) guns; 2 × 18-inch (450 mm) torpedo tubes
- Armour: 6 inch casemates; 4.5-2 inch decks

HMS Spartiate was a ship of the Diadem-class protected cruisers in the Royal Navy. She was built at Pembroke Dock and launched on 27 October 1898. She was a stokers' training ship in 1914 and was renamed Fisgard in June 1915. She survived the First World War and was sold in July 1932. She returned to Pembroke to be broken up.

== Construction ==
Spartiate was laid down at Pembroke Dockyard, and launched on 27 October 1898, when she was christened by Mrs. Burges Watson, wife of Captain Burges Watson, Captain Superintendent of the yard. She was delivered at Portsmouth from Pembroke dockyard in April, 1900, and in the following winter went on her trials. Sand in the condensers led to friction in her machinery, and her engines had to be re-constructed. New trials the following year ended with her condenser tubes leaking so badly they had to be replaced with new ones before she could be ready. A third attempt at trials in April 1902 was also abandoned, but she finally completed her trials in July that year, and was ready for sea in March 1903.

== Service history ==
Spartiate was commissioned in early 1903 by Captain Alban Giffard Tate, for service in home waters. The previous year she had been mentioned as a possible flagship for the Australia Station, but this never happened (possibly due to the delay in her trials).
