= General Pershing (motor ship) =

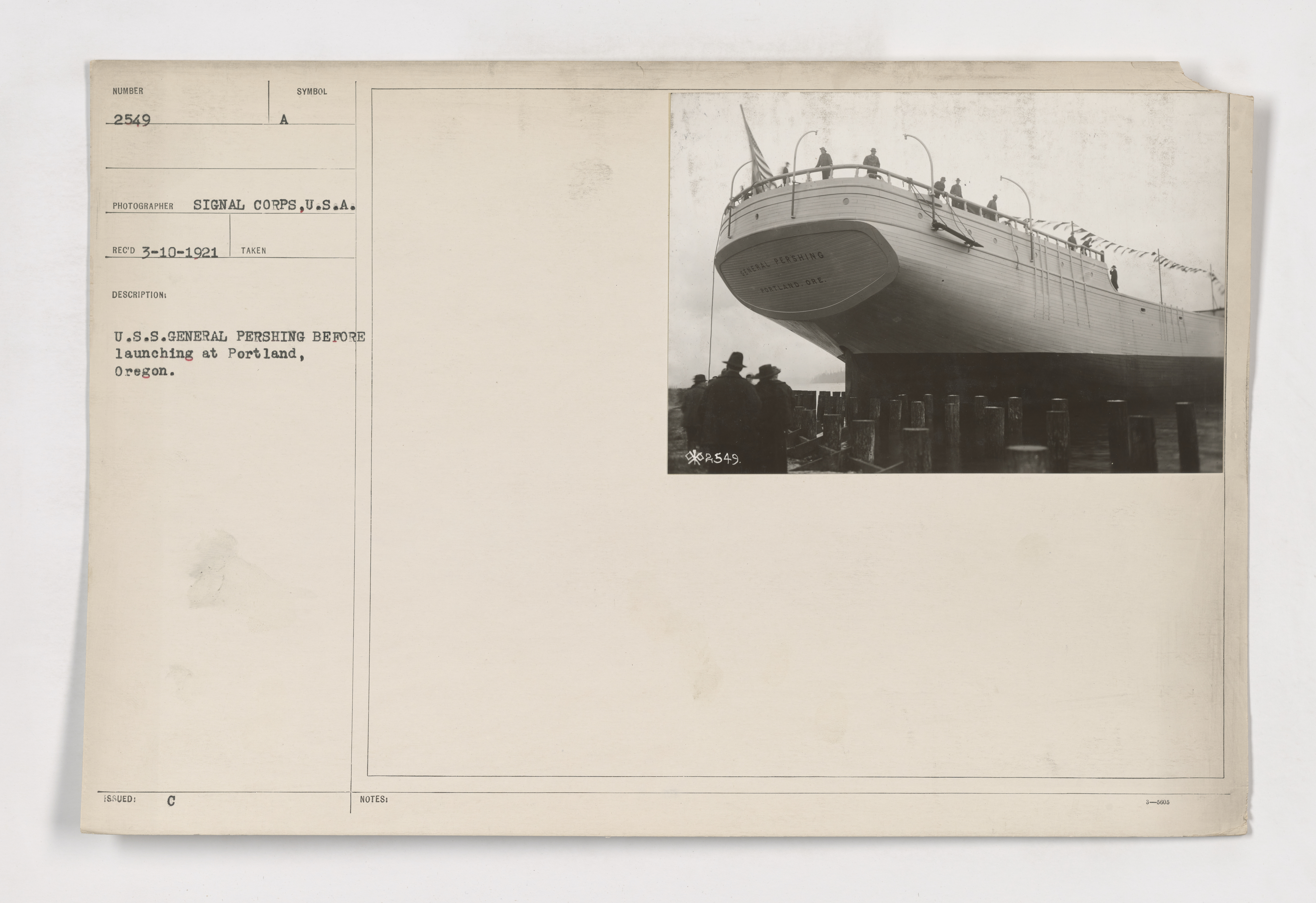
- General Pershing before launching at Portland

History

United States
- Name: General Pershing
- Namesake: John J. Pershing
- Builder: Olympia Ship Building Company, Olympia Washington
- Completed: 1918
- Home port: Portland Oregon
- Identification: 216063 Signal Letters: LJTC
- Fate: Wrecked 11 July 1921

General characteristics
- Type: Freighter
- Tonnage: 2,450 long tons (2,489 t) Gross
- Length: 266.2 ft (81.1 m)
- Beam: 48 ft (15 m)
- Depth of hold: 24.1 ft (7.3 m)
- Propulsion: Motor & Sail
- Complement: 14

General Pershing was a 266.2 ft (81.1 m) wooden auxiliary vessel, a five masted bald-headed schooner. Built in 1918, Olympia Washington, General Pershing was powered with two 350 hp Sumner surface ignition engines.

== Operational history ==
General Pershing was originally built for use in the Atlantic trade by Norwegian interests and in 1921 was sold to the P.E. Harris Company of Seattle Washington for transporting salmon from Alaska canneries to the Atlantic and Gulf Coast markets via the Panama Canal.

On July 11, 1921, General Pershing struck the Endymion Rock, Turks Islands and was wrecked. Her crew were rescued.
