= HMS Andromeda (1897) =

British Diadem-class protected cruiser

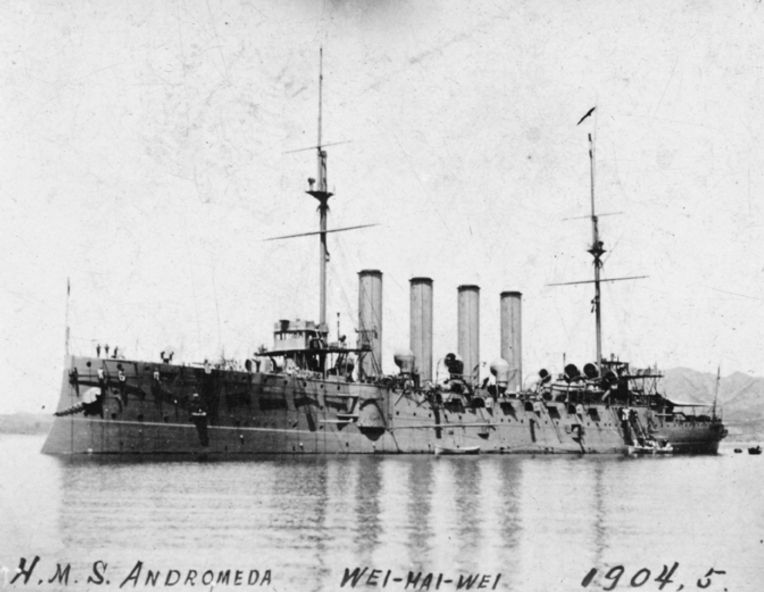
- Andromeda at anchor at Weihaiwei, China, 1904.

History

United Kingdom
- Name: Andromeda
- Namesake: Andromeda
- Builder: Pembroke Dockyard
- Laid down: 2 December 1895
- Launched: 30 April 1897
- Completed: 5 September 1899
- Renamed: Powerful II, 23 September 1913; Impregnable II November 1919; Defiance 20 January 1931
- Reclassified: As a training ship, 23 September 1913
- Fate: Sold for scrap, 1956

General characteristics
- Class & type: Diadem-class protected cruiser
- Displacement: 11,000 long tons (11,177 t)
- Length: 435 ft (132.6 m) (p/p)
- Beam: 69 ft (21.0 m)
- Draught: 25 ft 6 in (7.8 m)
- Installed power: 16,500 ihp (12,300 kW); 30 × Belleville boilers
- Propulsion: 2 shafts; 2 × Triple-expansion steam engines
- Speed: 20.5 kn (38.0 km/h; 23.6 mph)
- Complement: 677
- Armament: 16 × single QF 6-inch (152 mm) guns; 12 × single QF 12-pdr 3 in (76 mm) 12-cwt guns (Note: "Cwt" is the abbreviation for hundredweight, 20 cwt referring to the weight of the gun.); 3 × single QF 3-pdr 1.9 in (47 mm) Hotchkiss guns; 2 × 18-inch (450 mm) torpedo tubes
- Armour: 6 in (152 mm) casemates; 4.5–2 in (114–51 mm) decks

HMS Andromeda was one of eight Diadem-class protected cruisers built for the Royal Navy in the 1890s. Upon completion in 1899, the ship was assigned to the Mediterranean Fleet where she helped to escort a royal yacht during its cruise through the Mediterranean Sea. After a refit, she was assigned to the China Station in 1904 and returned home three years later to be reduced to reserve. Andromeda was converted into a training ship in 1913 and remained in that role under various names until 1956. That year she was sold for scrap and broken up in Belgium, the last Pembroke-built ship still afloat.

== Design and description ==
The Diadem class was designed to protect British merchant shipping from fast cruisers like the Russian Rurik and were smaller versions of the Powerful class. The ships had a length between perpendiculars of 435 feet (132.6 m), a beam of 69 feet (21.0 m) and a draught of 25 feet 6 inches (7.8 m). They displaced 11,000 long tons (11,000 t). The first batch of Diadems were powered by a pair of four-cylinder triple-expansion steam engines, each driving one shaft, which were designed to produce a total of 16,500 indicated horsepower (12,300 kW) and a maximum speed of 20.5 knots (38.0 km/h; 23.6 mph) using steam provided by 30 Belleville boilers. They carried a maximum of 1,900 long tons (1,930 t) of coal and their hulls were sheathed with copper to reduce biofouling. Their complement numbered 677 officers and ratings.

The main armament of the Diadem-class ships consisted of 16 quick-firing (QF) QF 6-inch (152 mm) guns. Four of these were on the forecastle and in the stern, all protected by gun shields. The remaining dozen guns were in armoured casemates on each broadside. The ships carried 200 rounds per gun. Protection against torpedo boats was provided by a dozen QF 12-pounder 3 in (76 mm), 12-cwt guns, for which 300 rounds per gun was provided, and 3 QF 3-pounder 1.9 in (47 mm) Hotchkiss guns. In addition, the ships carried a pair of Ordnance QF 12-pounder 8-cwt landing guns for use ashore. The ships were also armed with a pair of submerged 18-inch (450 mm) torpedo tubes.

The sloped armoured deck ranged in thickness from 2.5 to 4 inches (64 to 102 mm) on the flat and slopes, respectively. The casemates were protected by 6 inches of Harvey armour while the gun shields had 2 to 4.5 inches (51 to 114 mm) of armour. The conning towers were protected by 12-inch (305 mm) walls and their roofs were 2 inches thick. The tubes protecting the ammunition hoists were also 2 inches thick.

== Construction and career ==
Andromeda was the fifth ship of her name to serve in the Royal Navy and was laid down on 2 December 1895 by Pembroke Dockyard. The ship was launched on 30 April 1897 by Lady Scourfield, wife of Sir Owen Scourfield Bt. She was fitted out at Pembroke Dock until 5 September 1898 and sailed later that month to Portsmouth Dockyard for completion.

=== Mediterranean service ===
Upon completion on 5 September 1899, she was assigned to the Mediterranean Fleet under the command of Captain John Leslie Burr. In March 1900 she did a month's cruise of Italian and Spanish ports, and in early April that year she was briefly port guardship at Gibraltar before returning to the station headquarter at Malta. In March 1901 the ship was one of two cruisers tasked to escort the ocean liner HMS Ophir, commissioned as a royal yacht for the World tour of the Duke and Duchess of Cornwall and York (later King George V and Queen Mary), from Gibraltar to Malta, and then to Port Said. Captain Christopher Cradock was appointed in command on 24 March 1902, and from 11 June that year Andromeda served as flagship of the Cruiser Division of the Mediterranean Fleet. In May 1902 she visited Palermo to attend festivities in connection with the opening of an Agricultural Exhibition by King Victor Emmanuel, and the following month the ship was in Gibraltar for a coronation fête. Andromeda and other ships of the division visited Argostoli in early October 1902. She returned home later that year and paid off at Portsmouth on 10 February 1903, then transferred to the dockyard for a lengthy refit.

=== China station and Home Fleet ===
Andromeda was assigned to the China Station in 1904 and returned home three years later.

The ship was reduced to reserve at Chatham Dockyard upon her return, but transferred to Devonport Dockyard shortly afterwards. In 1907 Lieutenant Quentin Crauford was authorised by the Admiralty to create an experimental radio station to broadcast to the fleet in Chatham – and this was the first wireless broadcast of music and speech for the purpose of entertainment in Britain.Andromeda was assigned to the 9th Cruiser Squadron of the new reserve Third Fleet in 1912. The following year the ship was converted to a boys' training ship and renamed Powerful II on 23 September 1913. She was later renamed Impregnable II in November 1919 and finally, HMS Defiance on 20 January 1931, when she became part of the torpedo school. The ship was sold for scrap in 1956 and arrived at Burgt, Belgium, on 14 August to begin demolition.
