= HMS Europa (1897) =

Cruiser of the Royal Navy

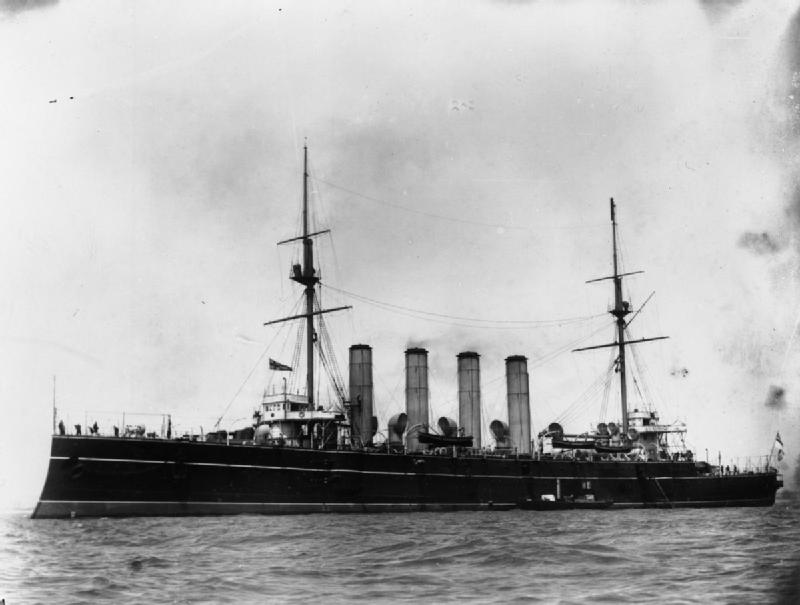
- HMS Europa

History

United Kingdom
- Name: HMS Europa
- Builder: J&G Thompson, Clydebank
- Laid down: 10 January 1896
- Launched: 20 March 1897
- Fate: Sold 15 September 1920

General characteristics
- Class & type: Diadem-class protected cruiser
- Displacement: 11,000 tons
- Length: 435 ft (133 m) (462 ft 6 in (140.97 m) o/a)
- Beam: 69 ft (21 m)
- Draught: 25 ft 6 in (7.77 m)
- Propulsion: 2 shaft triple expansion engines; 16.500 - 18,000 hp
- Speed: 20–20.5 kn (37.0–38.0 km/h; 23.0–23.6 mph)
- Complement: 760
- Armament: 16 × single QF 6-inch (152 mm) guns; 14 × single QF 12-pounder (76 mm) guns; 3 × single QF 3-pounder (47 mm) guns; 2 × 18-inch (450 mm) torpedo tubes
- Armour: 6 inch casemates; 4.5-2 inch decks

HMS Europa was a ship of the Diadem-class protected cruisers in the Royal Navy. She was built by J&G Thompson of Clydebank and launched on 20 March 1897.

In 1899, Europa was equipped with wireless, and took part in the Summer Manoeuvres of that year. She sent a wireless message 95 miles to HMS Alexandra, relayed by HMS Juno, reporting making contact with convoy she was to escort. This was longest ship to ship transmission to date.

== Service history ==
In the early years of her career, she served with the Channel Squadron. She left Portsmouth on 19 January 1900 with a new crew for HMS Ramillies, which had recently become flagship of the second in command, Mediterranean station. Returning from Malta she transported the paid-off crew of Ramillies to Portsmouth, where she arrived the following month. She was then ordered to take out reliefs for the Australia Station, passing through Gibraltar, Malta, Port Said and other stops en route.

She underwent a general refit in 1902, including new boilers.

At some point a few years later she was put into reserve at Devonport whereby she was later recommissioned in November 1907 for the Home Fleet and paid off February 1910 but joined 3rd Fleet from November 1911 to outbreak of war.

On the outbreak of the First World War she was assigned to the 9th Cruiser Squadron operating in the Atlantic and was stationed off Cape Finisterre as flagship until June 1915. In 1915 she was operating off Moudros, participating in the Dardanelles campaign, for which she received a battle honour.

Europa was the flagship at Mudros July 1915 – 1919 and paid off at Malta in March 1920. Purchased by G F Bletto on 15 September 1920 for conversion to an emigrant carrier, the vessel sank in a gale off Corsica in January 1921. The wreck was later raised and broken up in Genoa.
