= SS Kenwood Bridge =

History

United States
- Name: Kenwood Bridge (1919–1920); Leonita (1920–1921)
- Namesake: Kenwood Bridge Co.
- Owner: USSB (1919–1920); José Luis de Ansoleaga (1920–1921)
- Operator: C. H. Sprague & Son (1919); José Luis de Ansoleaga (1920–1921)
- Ordered: 16 November 1917
- Builder: Submarine Boat Company, Newark
- Yard number: 79
- Laid down: 2 June 1919
- Launched: 25 September 1919
- Sponsored by: Miss Marion H. Willis
- Completed: October 1919
- Maiden voyage: 12 December 1919
- In service: 29 November 1919
- Home port: Newark (1919–1920); Bilbao (1920–2921)
- Identification: US Official number 219051; Call sign LTGF
- Fate: Sank, 13 March 1921

General characteristics
- Type: Design 1023 ship
- Tonnage: 3,545 GRT; 2,174 NRT; 5,300 DWT
- Length: 324.0 ft (98.8 m)
- Beam: 46.2 ft (14.1 m)
- Draft: 22 ft 9 1/2 in (6.947 m) (loaded)
- Depth: 25.0 ft (7.6 m)
- Installed power: 1,500 ihp
- Propulsion: Westinghouse Electric steam turbine double reduction geared to one screw
- Speed: 10 1/2 knots (19.4 km/h)

Kenwood Bridge was a steam cargo ship built in 1919 by Submarine Boat Company of Newark for the United States Shipping Board (USSB) as part of the wartime shipbuilding program of the Emergency Fleet Corporation (EFC) to restore the nation's Merchant Marine. In early 1920 the vessel was sold to Spanish company and renamed Leonita. In March 1921 while on passage to Italy with a cargo of coal she developed a leak and foundered.

== Design and construction ==
After the United States entry into World War I, a large shipbuilding program was undertaken to restore and enhance shipping capabilities both of the United States and their Allies. As part of this program, EFC placed orders with nation's shipyards for a large number of vessels of standard designs. Design 1023 cargo ship was a standard cargo freighter of approximately 5,300 tons deadweight designed by Submarine Boat Corp. and adopted by USSB.

Kenwood Bridge was part of the second optional order for 68 additional vessels placed by USSB with Submarine Boat Corp. on 16 November 1917. The ship was laid down at the shipbuilder's yard on 2 June 1919 (yard number 79) and launched on 25 September 1919, with Miss Marion H. Willis, daughter of Paul Willis, President of Kenwood Bridge Company of Chicago, being the sponsor. The vessel was named after the company, one of many providers of fabricated steel for the shipyard.

Similar to all vessels of this class the ship had three islands and one main deck, had machinery situated amidships and had four main holds, both fore and aft, which allowed for the carriage of variety of goods and merchandise. The vessel also possessed all the modern machinery for quick loading and unloading of cargo from five large hatches, including ten winches and ten booms. She was also equipped with wireless apparatus and had electrical lights installed along the deck.

As built, the ship was 324.0 feet (98.8 m) long (between perpendiculars) and 46.2 feet (14.1 m) abeam and had a depth of 25.0 feet (7.6 m). Kenwood Bridge was originally assessed at 3,545 GRT and 2,174 NRT and had deadweight of approximately 5,300. The vessel had a steel hull with double bottom throughout and a single turbine rated at 1,500 shp, double reduction geared to a single screw propeller, that moved the ship at up to 10 1/2 knots (12.1 mph; 19.4 km/h). The steam for the engine was supplied by two Babcock & Wilcox Water Tube boilers fitted for oil fuel.

The sea trials were held on November 5 during which the vessel performed satisfactorily. Subsequently, the vessel was inspected by the USSB representatives and officially accepted by them on 29 November 1919.

== Operational history ==
Upon acceptance the freighter was allocated by the Shipping Board to C. H. Sprague & Son to serve on their newly established trade route to Scandinavia. Kenwood Bridge first proceeded to Philadelphia where she arrived on December 1. After partial loading the vessel continued on to Boston several days later where she embarked the rest of her cargo. Kenwood Bridge sailed on her maiden voyage from Boston on 12 December 1919 carrying cargo consisting of steel, food, machinery and other general cargo bound for Kristiania, Gothenburg and Copenhagen. After an uneventful journey the vessel reached Kristiania on 3 January 1920 and then continued on to the remaining destinations. Subsequently, Kenwood Bridge stayed in the Baltic Sea area through the winter making several trips between Gothenburg and United Kingdom transporting lumber and wood pulp. In late March 1920 the freighter arrived in London where she was slated to pick up a cargo of block chalk for delivery to Boston, however, the freighter was unexpectedly sold in early April to Spanish shipping company José Luis de Ansoleaga y Compañía Limitada for $1,015,000. The vessel then left Southampton for New York on April 18 via Bilbao where she was officially transferred to her new owners and embarked Spanish crew. The vessel was also renamed Leonita. After an uneventful voyage the ship reached New York on May 6.

Under the new ownership the vessel was involved in tramp trade mostly moving coal from the East Coast of the United States to various ports in Europe. For example, on 9 August 1920 Leonita sailed out from Hampton Roads with 4,276 tons of coal bound for Le Havre. The steamer conducted one more trip with coal from Baltimore to France in October 1920. On her next trip she transported 4,000 tons of phosphate hard rock from Fernandina to Bilbao in December 1920.

On 21 February 1921 Leonita loaded 4,075 tons of coal at Hampton Roads and departed Norfolk three days later on her last trip bound for Cittavecchia via Gibraltar. The voyage was eventful until the night of March 12–13 when the ship was in approximate position 36°40′N 7°40′W just west off Gibraltar. The freighter suddenly developed a leak, and an S.O.S. call was dispatched while an entire crew of thirty four and the captain hastily abandoned the vessel. The call was received by a nearby steamer, SS Haworth, who quickly came to the rescue saving the crew while Leonita went down to the bottom.

Location of the sinking of Leonita.

At the time of her loss Leonita was valued at approximately £55,000 while her hull and machinery were insured for £12,000 and the vessel carried additional insurance totaling altogether £245,000. Given such large disparity between the actual value and the amount of insurance coverage, a foul play was suspected by the insurance company and loss payments were denied to the owners. The owners sued the insurance company and in ensuing legal action the courts sided with the insurance company. The overabundance of available tonnage and scarcity of cargo led to precipitous fall in freight rates and ship values. The owners paid for the vessel in installments and still owed significant amount of money to the Shipping Board. Leonita's trip to Italy was conducted at a significant loss. In addition, the ship foundered within 40 nautical miles (74 km; 46 mi) of the coast in calm weather with crew safety never in question and captain abandoning the vessel right away. Further, owners claimed that the loss was caused by engine breakdown and fracture of condenser feed-pipe which flooded the ship from within causing the hull to give way, which the courts found incredible. Based on these factors, the courts decided that the ship was deliberately scuttled with the connivance of the owners to collect insurance money.
