= Diadem-class cruiser =

British naval ship class (1898–1925)

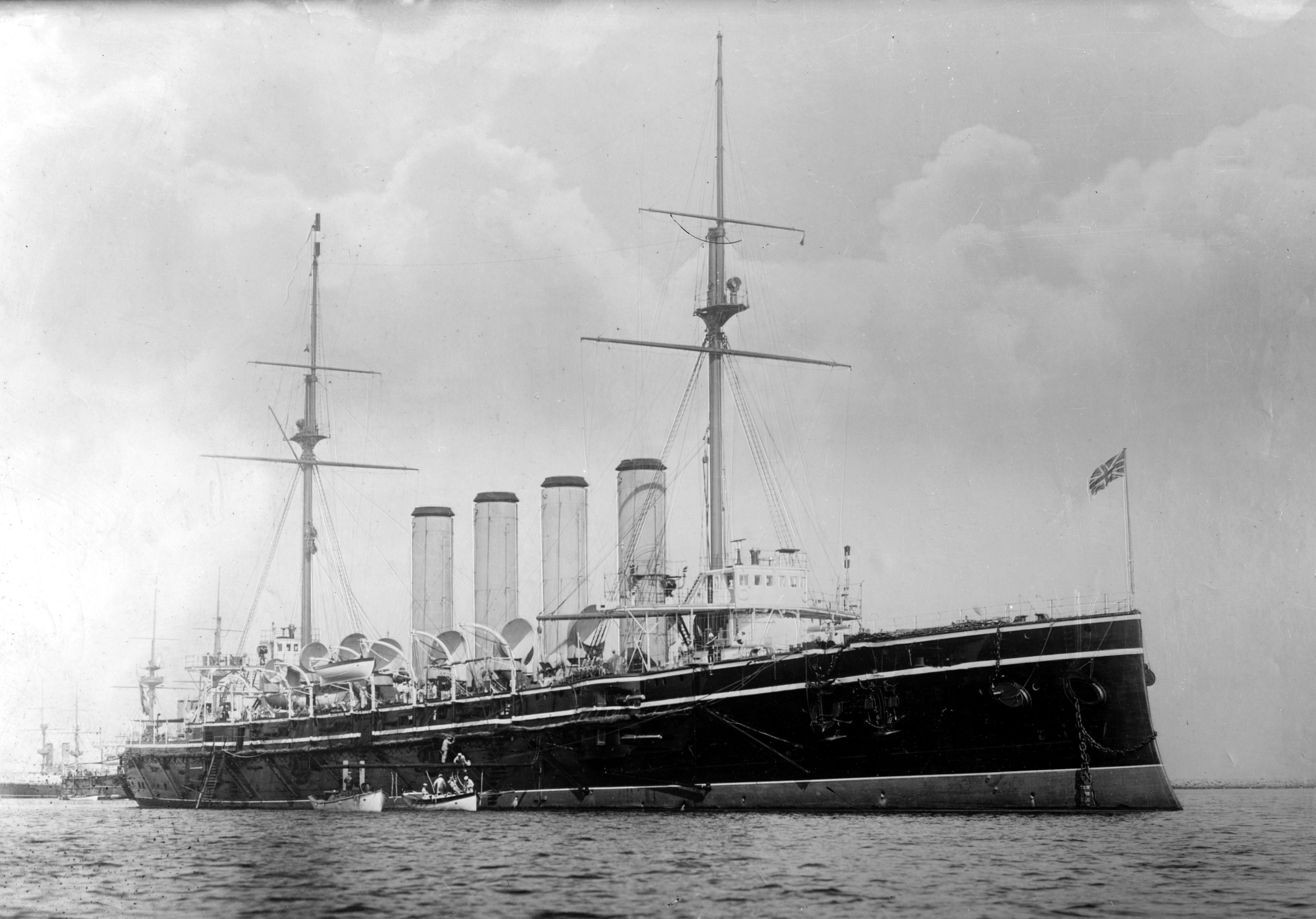
- HMCS Niobe

Class overview
- Name: Diadem class
- Operators: Royal Navy; Royal Canadian Navy
- Preceded by: Powerful class
- Succeeded by: Cressy class
- Built: 1896–1903
- In commission: 1898–1925
- Completed: 8
- Retired: 8

General characteristics
- Type: Protected cruiser
- Displacement: 11,000 tons
- Length: 435 ft (132.6 m); (462 ft 6 in (140.97 m) o/a)
- Beam: 69 ft (21.0 m)
- Draught: 25 ft 6 in (7.77 m); 27 ft 6 in (8.38 m)
- Propulsion: 2 shaft triple expansion engines: 16,500 hp (12,300 kW); (Ariadne, Spartiate, Amphitrite and Argonaut: 18,000 hp (13,000 kW)); Belleville boilers
- Speed: 20.25 knots (37.50 km/h; 23.30 mph); (Ariadne, Spartiate, Amphitrite and Argonaut: 20.75 knots (38.43 km/h; 23.88 mph))
- Range: 2,000 nmi (3,700 km; 2,300 mi) at 19 knots (35.2 km/h; 21.9 mph); (bunker capacity 1900 tons)
- Complement: 677
- Armament: 16 × single QF 6-inch (152 mm) guns (Note: Jane's Fighting Ships 1900 claimed on page 108 that the Diadems had 6-in 45 calibre guns. The 6-in BL Mk VII was 45 calibres. This was later corrected in subsequent editions to the 40 calibre QF guns); 14 × single 12-pounder (76 mm) QF guns; 3 × single QF 3-pounder (47 mm) guns; 2 × 18-inch (450 mm) torpedo tubes (underwater); 8 Maxim machine guns
- Armour: Casemates and gun shields 4.5 in (110 mm); Hoists 2 in (51 mm); Deck 4–2.5 in (102–64 mm); Conning tower 12 in (300 mm) fore; 6 in (150 mm) tube to fore conning tower; 2 in (51 mm) aft conning tower; Armour was Harvey Nickel steel, except for armoured deck.

The Diadem-class cruiser was a class of "first class" protected cruiser built for the Royal Navy during the 1890s that served in the First World War. The class consisted of eight ships, built at a cost of around £600,000 each.

They were considered "good sea boats" but criticised for their lack of a heavy calibre main armament, bulky unprotected sides, average speed and lack of manoeuvrability despite being considered large ships when completed. They were the last British first class protected cruisers; the armoured cruiser taking the large cruiser role in future."

== Design ==
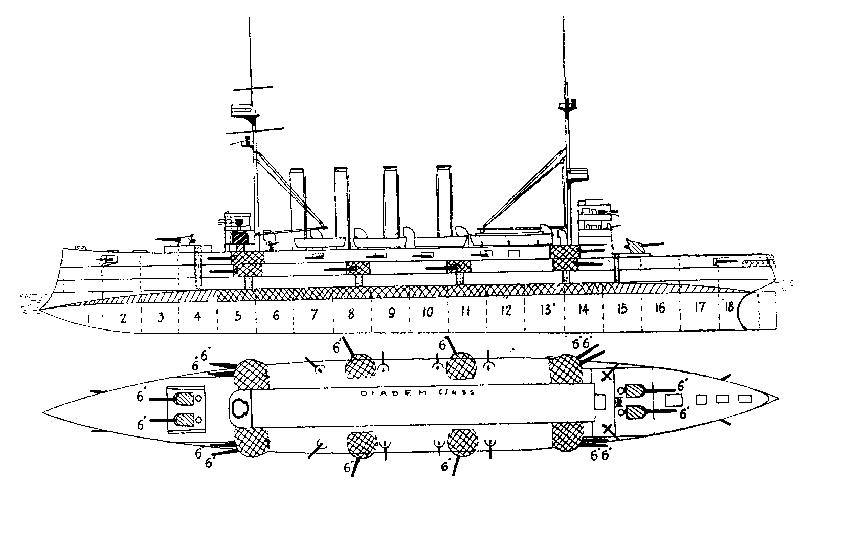
Contemporary deck plan and port elevation of Diadem-class cruiser

The Diadems were designed by Sir William White, and are typical of British design practice of the period, with high freeboard (by the standards of the time) and the use of 'double-decker' casemates, with the hull forward and aft cut away to allow fore and aft fire from the casemate guns. Casemates provided protection for the guns and allowed a large number of guns to bear on the broadside; however, the lower (main deck) guns were almost unusable in heavy seas.

According to a contemporary (1900) edition of Jane's Fighting Ships the hulls were wood sheathed and coppered. and "There are coal bunkers on the lower deck, and above and below the armour deck. The pair of 6 in guns forward and aft are served by one hoist to the pair, each casemate has its own hoist: those to the double casemates being double. The machinery weighs 1630 tons: the boilers occupy a space of about 132 feet (40 m). Working pressure is [300 to 250 psi (2.1 to 1.7 MPa)]. "The ships are almost absolutely identical in appearance. The Diadem and Andromeda have no steam pipes abaft the first two funnels, while all the others have steam pipes before and abaft each funnel."

== History ==
The Diadem class was intended, like the preceding Powerful class, for trade protection, and were intended to be "capable of dealing with any cruiser existing or building". The Powerfuls had proved costly and demanding in manpower, and the new class had to represent a more economical solution, that could be built and operated in greater numbers. To achieve this, the specification was reduced relative to the Powerfuls: power and speed were reduced from 25,000 indicated horsepower (19,000 kW) (22 knots (41 km/h; 25 mph)) to 16,500 ihp (12,300 kW) (about 20 kn (37 km/h; 23 mph)), the thickness of the protective deck reduced from 6 inches (150 mm) to 4 inches (100 mm), and the armament simplified by replacing the single 9.2-inch (234 mm) guns fore and aft with pairs of 6-inch (152 mm) guns, mounted side by side. These changes saved about £100,000 per ship (approximately 15%) relative to the Powerful design.

With eight ships, each of 11,000 tons and costing £600,000, the Diadems were an important class. However, they proved controversial. The naval journalist Fred Jane characterised them as "much-discussed" and complained that "all the weak points of the Powerfuls were exaggerated in them". In particular, contemporary critics raised objections to their indifferent speed, poor manoeuvrability, and lack of heavy guns, and the fact that, while most of the armament was well protected in casemates, the fore and aft pairs of guns, which commanded the greatest fields of fire, were protected only by gunshields.

Although the powerplant used Belleville boilers, which were of the then-new water-tube type, most of the ships enjoyed the reputation of good steamers; the exception was Niobe, whose engines gave persistent trouble. The first four ships were troubled by vibration; to remedy this, the engine rooms of the last four were rearranged; the new configuration also provided a 1,500 hp (1,100 kW) increase in power. All eight ships exceeded their design power on trials; the first four averaged 20.5 knots (38.0 km/h) in service, the later four 21 knots (39 km/h).

In general the Diadems served most of their careers in home waters, although there were some deployments to China Station, the Mediterranean and the Caribbean. Niobe was sold to Canada in 1910. After 1906, they were only occasionally in commission, and by 1914 the class had for the most part been relegated to training ship and depot ship duties. However, with the outbreak of the First World War, several of them were reactivated, initially for patrol duties with the 9th Cruiser Squadron in the Eastern Atlantic. In 1917 Amphitrite and Ariadne were converted into minelayers, for service with the Dover Patrol. Ariadne was the only war loss, being torpedoed by the German submarine UC-65 on 26 July 1917. By the end of the war the survivors had again been withdrawn from active service, and all of them had been sold for scrap by 1932, with the exception of Andromeda, which served as a boys’ training ship until 1956.

== Building Programme ==
Standard British practice at that time was for building costs to exclude armament and stores. (Note: Brassey's Naval Annual (BNA) gave costs for these ships that were on average £25,600 greater in the 1904 and 1905 editions than in the 1906 and subsequent editions. Brassey's Naval Annual 1914 (p. 200) only lists two of the Diadems and quotes the same cost as the 1906 edition. Niobe is listed under Canada (page 207) but no cost is given.)

Ship	Builder	Date of			Cost according to	
Ship	Builder	Laid Down	Launch	Completion	(BNA 1904 & 1905)	(BNA 1906)
Diadem	Fairfield, Govan	23 Jan 1896	21 Oct 1896	19 July 1898	£582,662	£554,863
Amphitrite	Vickers, Barrow	8 Dec 1896	5 Jul 1898	17 Sep 1901	£575,300	£552,795
Andromeda	Pembroke Dockyard	2 Dec 1895	30 Apr 1897	5 Sep 1899	£601,356	£574,916
Argonaut	Fairfield, Govan	23 Nov 1896	24 Jan 1898	19 Apr 1900	£573,704	£545,756
Ariadne	J&G Thompson, Clydebank	29 Oct 1896	22 Apr 1898	5 Jun 1902	£565,464	£541,927
Europa	J&G Thompson, Clydebank	10 Jan 1896	20 Mar 1897	23 Nov 1899	£589,835	£564,690
Niobe	Vickers, Barrow	16 Dec 1895	20 Feb 1897	6 Dec 1898	£574,878	£548,283
Spartiate	Pembroke Dockyard	10 May 1897	27 Oct 1898	17 Mar 1903	£680,188	£654,661
