= August 1921 =

Month of 1921

<<	August 1921					>>
Su	Mo	Tu	We	Th	Fr	Sa
	1	2	3	4	5	6
7	8	9	10	11	12	13
14	15	16	17	18	19	20
21	22	23	24	25	26	27
28	29	30	31

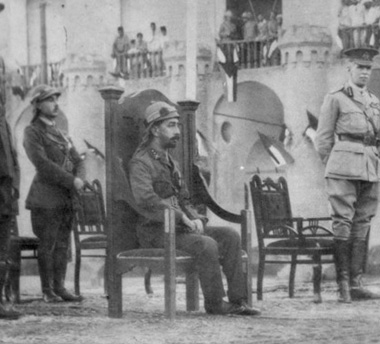
August 23, 1921: Faisal al-Hashemi crowned as first King of Iraq

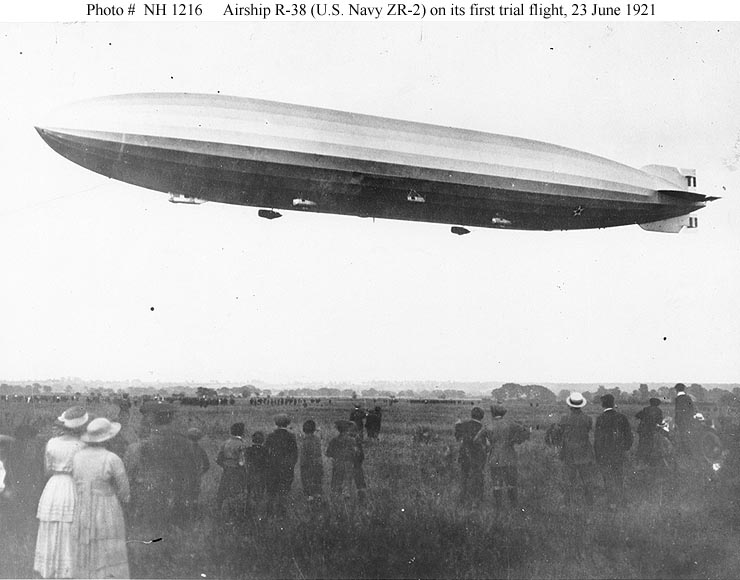
August 24, 1921: 44 killed in the crash of the largest dirigible in the world, ZR-2

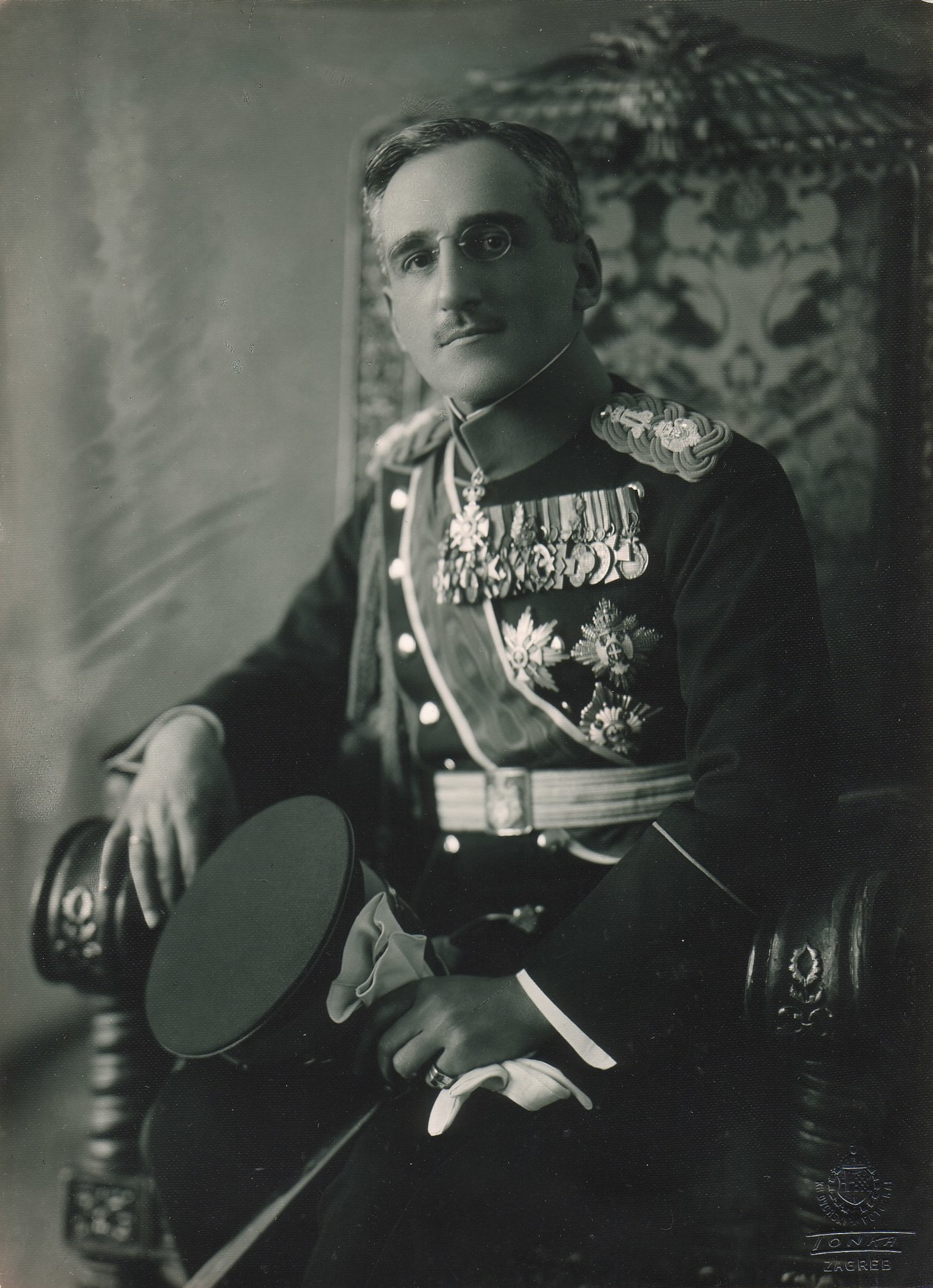
August 22, 1921: Alexander I takes oath in Paris hospital as new King of Yugoslavia

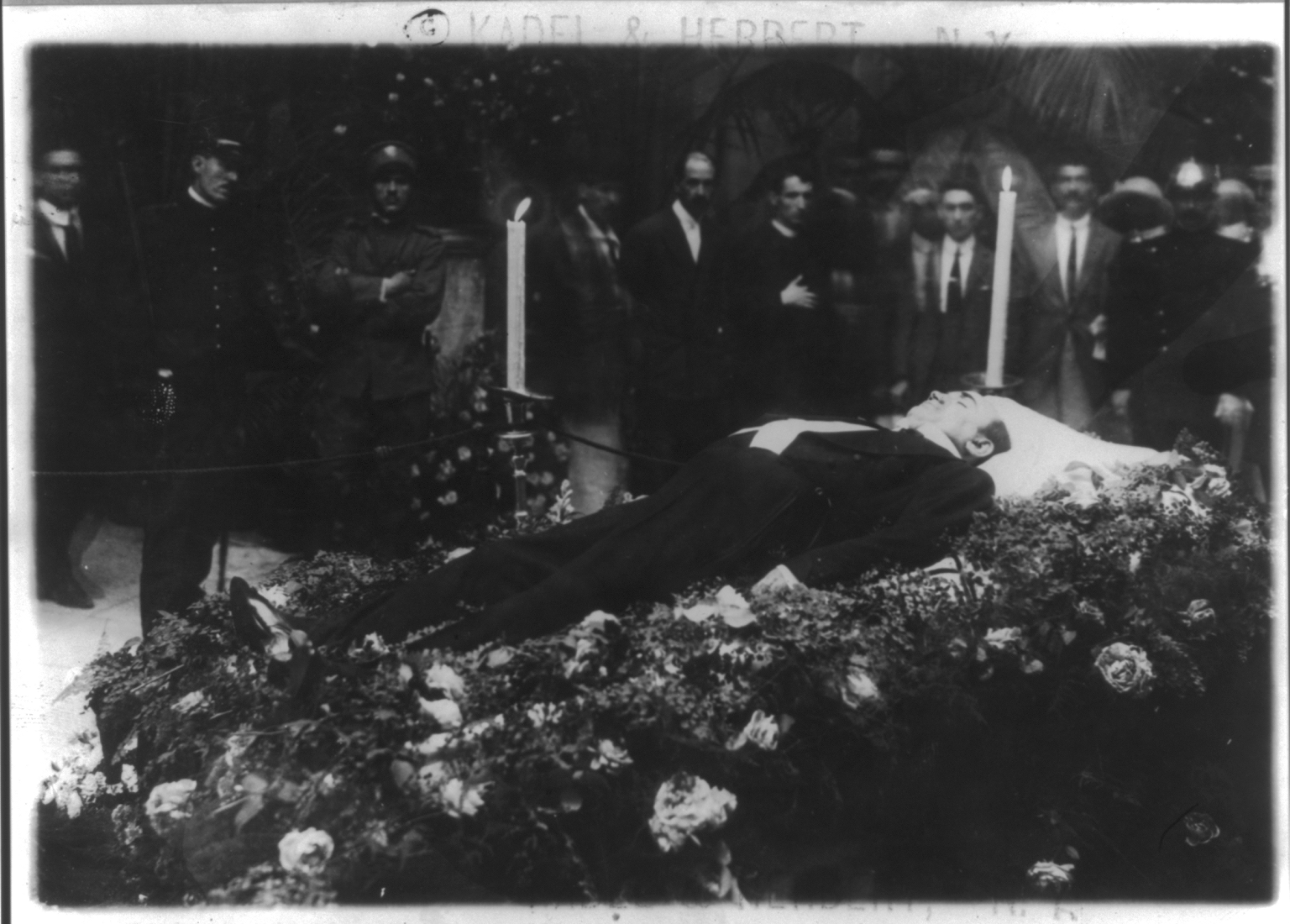
August 2, 1921: Opera tenor Enrico Caruso dead at age 48 from infection

The following events occurred in August 1921:

== August 1, 1921 (Monday) ==
- The first congress of the South African Communist Party concluded, in Cape Town.
- Riots broke out in Spain and troops mutinied against the government of King Alfonso XIII after the defeat of Spanish troops by Moroccan tribesmen in Melilla.
- U.S. President Warren G. Harding officiated at the tercentenary celebration at Plymouth, Massachusetts for the 300th anniversary of the landing of the Pilgrims in North America.

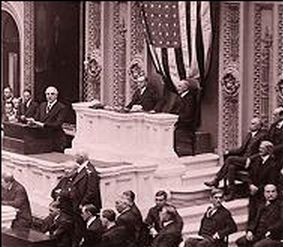
Harding at the U.S. Senate

- President Harding informed the U.S. Congress that Secretary of State Hughes had concluded that the U.S. was obligated to lend five million dollars to Liberia as part of an agreement made in September, 1918.
- Born: Jack Kramer, U.S. tennis player and commentator, in Las Vegas (d. 2009)

== August 2, 1921 (Tuesday) ==
- The Spanish outposts of Nadar and Selouane in Morocco fell to rebel forces in the aftermath of the Battle of Annual.
- The Black Sox scandal trial in Chicago ended with the acquittal by a jury of eight Chicago White Sox players on charges of conspiracy to throw the 1919 World Series, finding that the charges had not been proven beyond a reasonable doubt. Major League Baseball officials declared that the preponderance of the evidence was still sufficient to continue the ban against reinstating any of the former players. Baseball Commissioner K. M. Landis said in a statement, "Regardless of the verdict of juries, no player that throws a ball game; no player that undertakes or promises to throw a ball game; no player that sits in a conference with a bunch of crooked players and gamblers where the ways and means of throwing games are planned and discussed and does not promptly tell his club about it, will ever play professional baseball."
- The United States Coast Guard seized and boarded the British schooner Henry L. Marshall in international waters more than three miles (five kilometers) off the coast of Atlantic City, New Jersey, and found that the vessel was carrying 12,000 cases of liquor despite the prohibition against the sale and distribution of alcohol in the U.S.
- Born: Edward D. Goldberg, American marine chemist; in Sacramento, California (d. 2008)
- Died:
  - Enrico Caruso, 48, Italian operatic tenor, died of peritonitis. Caruso had been convalescing from illness at the Hotel Vesuvius in Naples and had been scheduled for emergency surgery for a subphrenic abscess, but died at 9:00 in the morning before he could be taken to a hospital.
  - Vajirananavarorasa, 61, Thai Buddhist leader and Supreme Patriarch of Thailand since 1910, died of tuberculosis.

== August 3, 1921 (Wednesday) ==
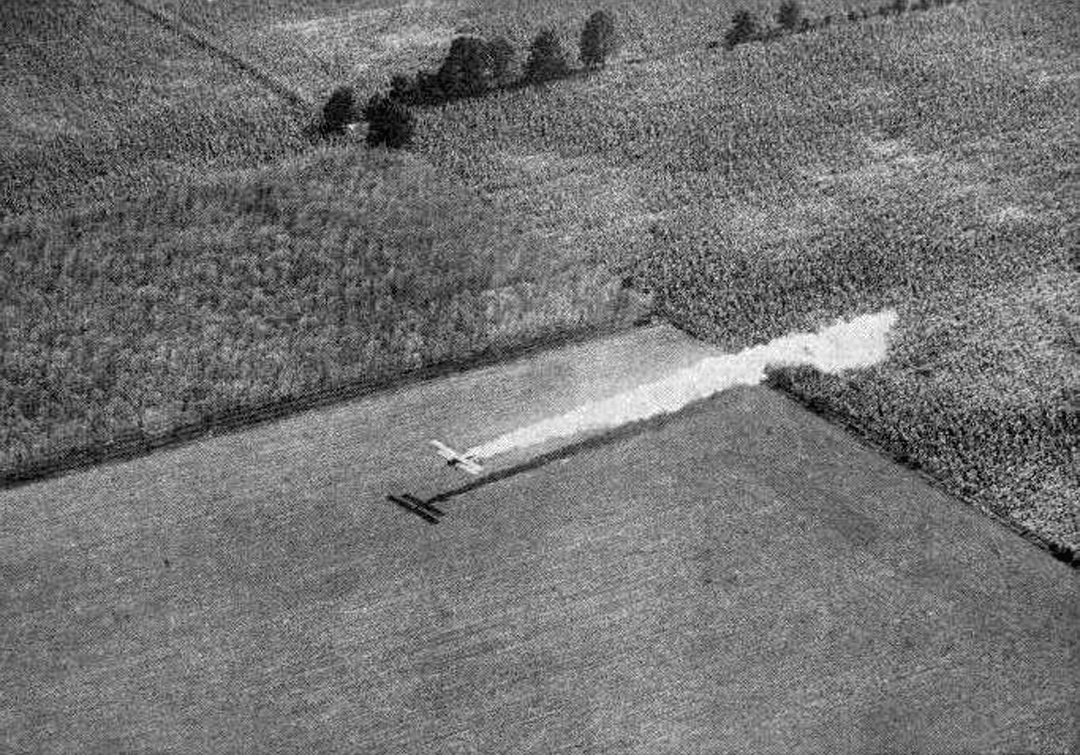
The first crop dusting by airplane

- "Aerial application" of sprayed pesticides to farmland by an airplane, commonly called "crop dusting", was performed for the first time. The procedure was developed as a joint venture by the U.S. Department of Agriculture and the U.S. Army Signal Corps. Pilot John A. Macready and engineer Etienne Dormoy took off from McCook Field near Dayton, and flew a Curtiss JN4 airplane to disperse lead arsenate to kill caterpillars at a farm near Troy, Ohio.
- A Pact of Pacification was signed between Italian leader Benito Mussolini’s Fascist Revolutionary Party (PFR), the Italian Socialist Party (PSI) and the General Confederation of Labor (CGL).
- In Germany, the Nazi Party's security unit, which would later become the Sturmabteilung (commonly called the "Storm Troopers"), was renamed the Turn und Sportabteilung division ("Gymnastic and Sports Division").
- Russian poet Nikolay Gumilyov was arrested in the Soviet Union by the Cheka secret police on charges of being a monarchist. He was executed along with 60 other defendants on August 25.
- Died: Jaime Camps, 25, Spanish Olympic sprinter, was killed in action at the Battle of Annual.

== August 4, 1921 (Thursday) ==
- The new Irish Republican parliament, Dáil Éireann, was summoned by Éamon de Valera to meet at Dublin on August 16 after negotiations with the United Kingdom secured a recognition of a self-governing Irish Free State rather than a province of Southern Ireland.
- For the first time, what is now called a "fax" was sent across the Atlantic Ocean when "a written document was transmitted fac simile... by wireless telegraphy" by the Belinograph machine, which had been used in Europe but had not been employed in North America. A handwritten message by New York Times editor C. V. Van Anda was transmitted from Annapolis, Maryland to Malmaison in France.
- The U.S. submarine USS S-12 (SS-117) was launched at Portsmouth Naval Shipyard in New Hampshire, after being christened by the wife of Gordon Woodbury, Assistant U.S. Secretary of the Navy.
- The first annual world championship for bicycle road racing was held by the Union Cycliste Internationale (UCI) in Copenhagen, and was won by Gunnar Sköld of Sweden.
- The U.S. Navy announced that the largest dirigible ever constructed up to that time, its Airship ZR-2, would begin its first transatlantic flight on August 25 to be brought to the United States from England.
- Born: Charles H. Coolidge, American Medal of Honor recipient and the longest-lived recipient from World War II; in Signal Mountain, Tennessee (d. 2021)

== August 5, 1921 (Friday) ==
- The first broadcast of a baseball game was aired by U.S. radio station KDKA, as the Pittsburgh Pirates defeated the Philadelphia Phillies 8 to 5 at Forbes Field. Harold Arlin, a Westinghouse Electric & Manufacturing Company, called the play-by-play during the broadcast.
- WRR-AM received its municipal license. It first broadcast out of the Dallas, Texas fire station. WRR was the first radio station in Texas and one of the first five radio stations in the US.
- In the Rif War against Morocco, the Army of Spain suffered more losses as the army garrisons in the cities of Nador and Selouane fell in North Africa, and 2,000 square miles (5,200 km^{2}) of Moroccan territory reclaimed by Arab tribesmen. Of 200 soldiers of the Selouane garrison, all but nine were killed.

== August 6, 1921 (Saturday) ==
- The sinking of the U.S. passenger ship Alaska killed 42 of the 214 people on board, with 31 passengers and 11 crew missing after the ship ran aground on Blunts Reef off the coast of California. The 172 survivors were rescued by the British ship Anyox.
- In return for American humanitarian aid to relieve the famine in the Soviet Union, the Russian Relief Committee's Chairman Kamenev pledged that all Americans held prisoner in Soviet Russia would be released to Walter L. Brown of the American Relief Administration.
- In the wake of the Upper Silesia plebiscite of March 1921, an expert report by the Committee of the Allied Supreme Council recommended a redefinition of the border between Poland and Germany, on the basis of which the greater part of the Upper Silesian industrial district was awarded to Poland.
- Died: Rorer A. James, 62, U.S. Representative for Virginia

== August 7, 1921 (Sunday) ==
- In accordance with an agreement between the United Kingdom and Irish Republicans, British prisons released all Sinn Féin members who had been elected to Dáil Éireann.
- Born: Manitas de Plata (stage name for Ricardo Baliardo), Spanish-French guitar virtuoso, in Sète in France (d. 2014)
- Died: Alexander Blok, 40, Russian poet, dramatist and critic

== August 8, 1921 (Monday) ==
- Italy and China announced that they would accept U.S. President Harding's invitation to participate in the Washington Disarmament Conference on November 11.
- Born: Esther Williams, U.S. champion swimmer and actress, in Inglewood, California (d. 2013)
- Died:
  - J. D. Edgar, 36, English professional golfer and twice winner of the Canadian Open, was killed by a hit-and-run driver in front of his home in Atlanta.
  - Thomas Wintringham, 54, British MP, died suddenly during a break in the parliamentary session at the Palace of Westminster, while in the smoking room with fellow Members of Commons. Margaret Wintringham, Wintringham's widow, would win the by-election for his seat on September 23, becoming only the second woman M.P. in British history.

== August 9, 1921 (Tuesday) ==
- Over 2,000 soldiers of the Spanish Army were killed after surrendering the Monte Arruit garrison near Al Aaroui in Morocco following a 12-day siege. General Felipe Navarro y Ceballos-Escalera was taken prisoner by the Moroccan Moors, along with his nine-member staff of officers, after Spanish forces were routed near Mount Arruit in North Africa.

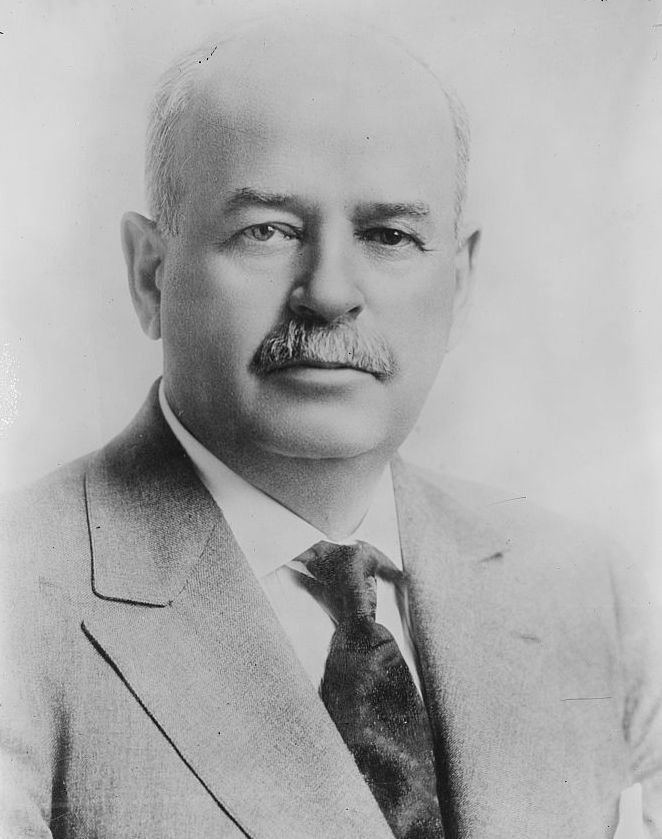
Governor Small

- Governor Lennington "Len" Small of the U.S. state of Illinois was placed under arrest at his home, the Executive Mansion in Springfield, Illinois, on warrants from three indictments made against him on charges of embezzlement during his prior job as Illinois State Treasurer. The sheriff of Sangamon County, Illinois, Henry Mester, came to the Governor's official residence, placed Small under arrest and required Small to come with him to for a court appearance before the Sangamon County Judge, who set a $50,000 bail to secure Small's appearance at a September hearing. Small posted his own bond as surety and was allowed to return home.

== August 10, 1921 (Wednesday) ==
- The Soviet Union began the release of American prisoners, with six Americans being turned over to the American Relief Administration at Reval in Estonia.
- The SS Moerdijk of the Holland-American steam line set a world speed record, completing a journey from London to Los Angeles in 24 days and 12 hours.
- The Allied Supreme Council announced its neutrality in the Greco-Turkish War, abandoning the Treaty of Sèvres that had granted territory of the former Ottoman Empire to Greece.
- Lord Byng of Vimy, appointed as the new Governor General of Canada, arrived in Canada after the steamer Empress of France brought him over from the United Kingdom.

== August 11, 1921 (Thursday) ==
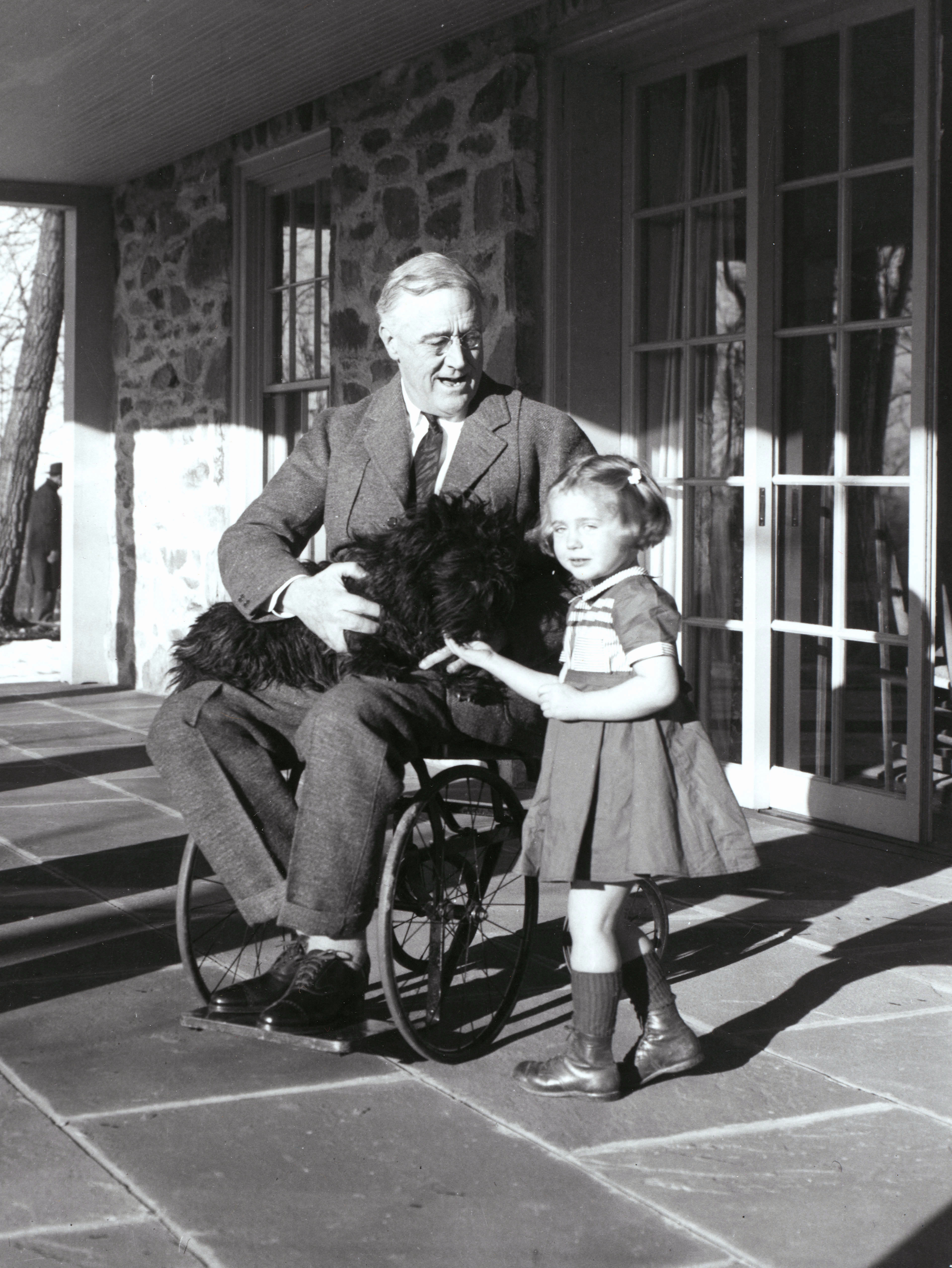
Roosevelt

- While on holiday at Lubec, Maine, future U.S. president (and recent U.S. vice presidential nominee in the 1920 election) Franklin D. Roosevelt suffered the first signs of paralysis from poliomyelitis. The disease was misdiagnosed by a local doctor as resulting from a bad cold.

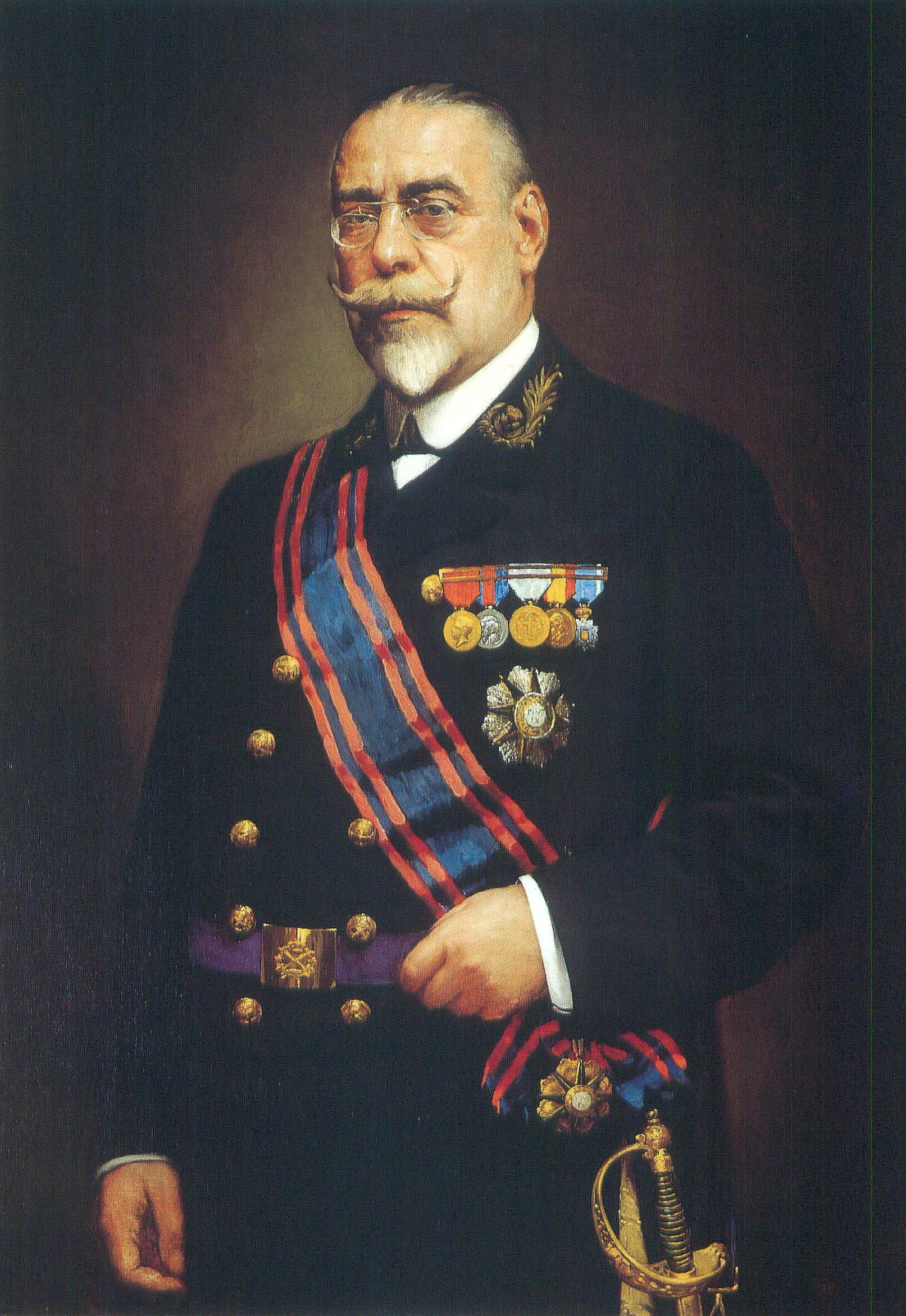
Allendesalazar

- Spain's Prime Minister Manuel Allendesalazar y Muñoz de Salazar and his cabinet resigned as a result of the Spanish defeat in Morocco. Antonio Maura, a former Premier, formed a new ministry two days later.
- Éamon de Valera sent his reply to British peace proposals to UK Prime Minister David Lloyd George, and the Prime Minister's office sent a charter airplane to Paris, where Lloyd George was meeting with the Allied Premiers.
- Lord Byng took office as the new Governor General of Canada.
- Forty people were killed in a landslide that struck the village of Klausen.
- Giovanni De Briganti won the 1921 Schneider Trophy race at Venice, Italy, in a Macchi M.7 with an average speed of 189.7 km/h (117.9 mph).
- The Packers and Stockyards Act of 1921 was signed into law by U.S. President Harding, allowing the Federal Trade Commission to regulate any company that engaged in interstate shipping of food products, specifically "livestock, livestock products, dairy products, poultry, poultry products, and eggs."
- Dr. G. Tryon Harding, father of the incumbent U.S. president, Warren Harding, surprised the White House by marrying a third time, traveling from Marion, Ohio to Monroe, Michigan to obtain a license. Dr. Harding and his longtime nurse and secretary, Alice Severns, initially drove to Canada and attempted to get a marriage license in Windsor, Ontario, only to be refused a license because of a new requirement of three months residency. The President's mother, Dr. Harding's first wife Phoebe Dickerson Harding, had died in 1910.
- Born:
  - Alex Haley, U.S. writer known for the bestseller Roots; in Ithaca, New York (d. 1992)
  - Henry Graff, American historian known for his reference works on the U.S. presidents; in New York City (d. 2020)
- Died: Father James Coyle, 48, Irish-born Roman Catholic priest, was murdered by Pastor E. R. Stephenson of the Southern Methodist Episcopal Church in Birmingham, Alabama after Coyle performed the marriage between Stephenson's daughter and a Puerto Rican Catholic. Stephenson would subsequently be acquitted by an Alabama jury on grounds of temporary insanity.

== August 12, 1921 (Friday) ==
- The Allied Supreme Council, unable to work out a settlement of the Silesian boundary question between Germany and Poland, referred the matter to the League of Nations.
- The French cargo ship St Clair caught fire at Mex, Egypt; it was beached and later declared a total loss.
- Born: Abel Paz (pen name for Diego Camacho Escámez), Spanish anarchist and historian; in Almeria (d. 2009)

== August 13, 1921 (Saturday) ==
- British Prime Minister David Lloyd George released the correspondence between himself and Sinn Fein President Éamon de Valera. On July 26, the British had proposed dominion status for Ireland, with complete authority over domestic affairs including taxation, finance, a judicial system, police and education, while Britain would manage Ireland's defense and foreign affairs. De Valera had replied on August 10 that he wanted "an amicable but absolute" separation of Ireland from the United Kingdom, with the question of Northern Ireland's status to be determined by a vote of all Irish voters. Lloyd George responded that the UK could never acknowledge Irish secession from the UK.
- Maxim Litvinov of the Soviet Union announced that the Soviets would comply with the terms of aid by the American Relief Administration, including freedom of movement within Soviet borders and Russian expense for distribution of humanitarian supplies after their delivery to Russian ports.
- The National Assembly of Hungary unanimously approved the U.S. peace resolution and began negotiation for a peace treaty to end the state of war that had started with U.S. entry into World War One against Austria-Hungary.
- The Inter-Allied Finance Conference, charged by the Allied Supreme Council in recommending the disposition of German reparation payments, ruled that none of the first one billion gold marks of payment should be given to France, but toward the reconstruction of the damage in Belgium.
- Herbert Greenfield replaced Charles Stewart as Premier of Alberta, Canada.
- Stormont Castle was designated as the future home of Northern Ireland's Parliament.
- Died: Samuel Pomeroy Colt, 69, American businessman and chairman of the board of the United States Rubber Company.

== August 14, 1921 (Sunday) ==
- Antonio Maura became President of the Council of Ministers of Spain in a coalition government, after the fall of the government of Manuel Allendesalazar.

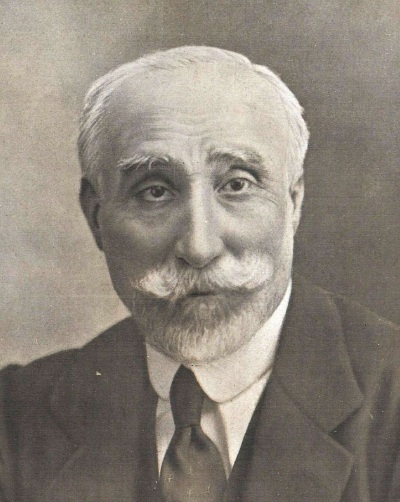
Maura

- The 1921 Massawa earthquake struck in Eritrea.
- The short-lived Baranya-Baja Republic was established in the Hungarian city of Pécs, in border territory occupied by troops from Yugoslavia.
- Died: Albert "Shrimp" Burns, U.S. motorcycle racer, 1919 U.S. champion and future inductee of the AMA Motorcycle Hall of Fame, was killed in a crash during a race in Toledo, Ohio.

== August 15, 1921 (Monday) ==
- The International Committee for Russian Relief (ICRR), founded to feed victims of the famine in Russia, was organized in Geneva by the International Committee of the Red Cross and the League of Red Cross Societies, led by Fridtjof Nansen.
- The British government relinquished control of the United Kingdom's railways, seven years after having taken over jurisdiction during World War One.
- A workers' congress began at Izamal in Mexico, and Felipe Carrillo Puerto was elected President of the Socialist Party of the Southeast. Carrillo's opening speech was made in the Yucatec Maya language.
- Born: Nils Christensen, Norwegian-born Canadian aviation engineer and businessman who founded Viking Air; in Høvik, Bærum, Norway (d. 2017)
- Died: Harriet Prescott Spofford, 86, American novelist

== August 16, 1921 (Tuesday) ==
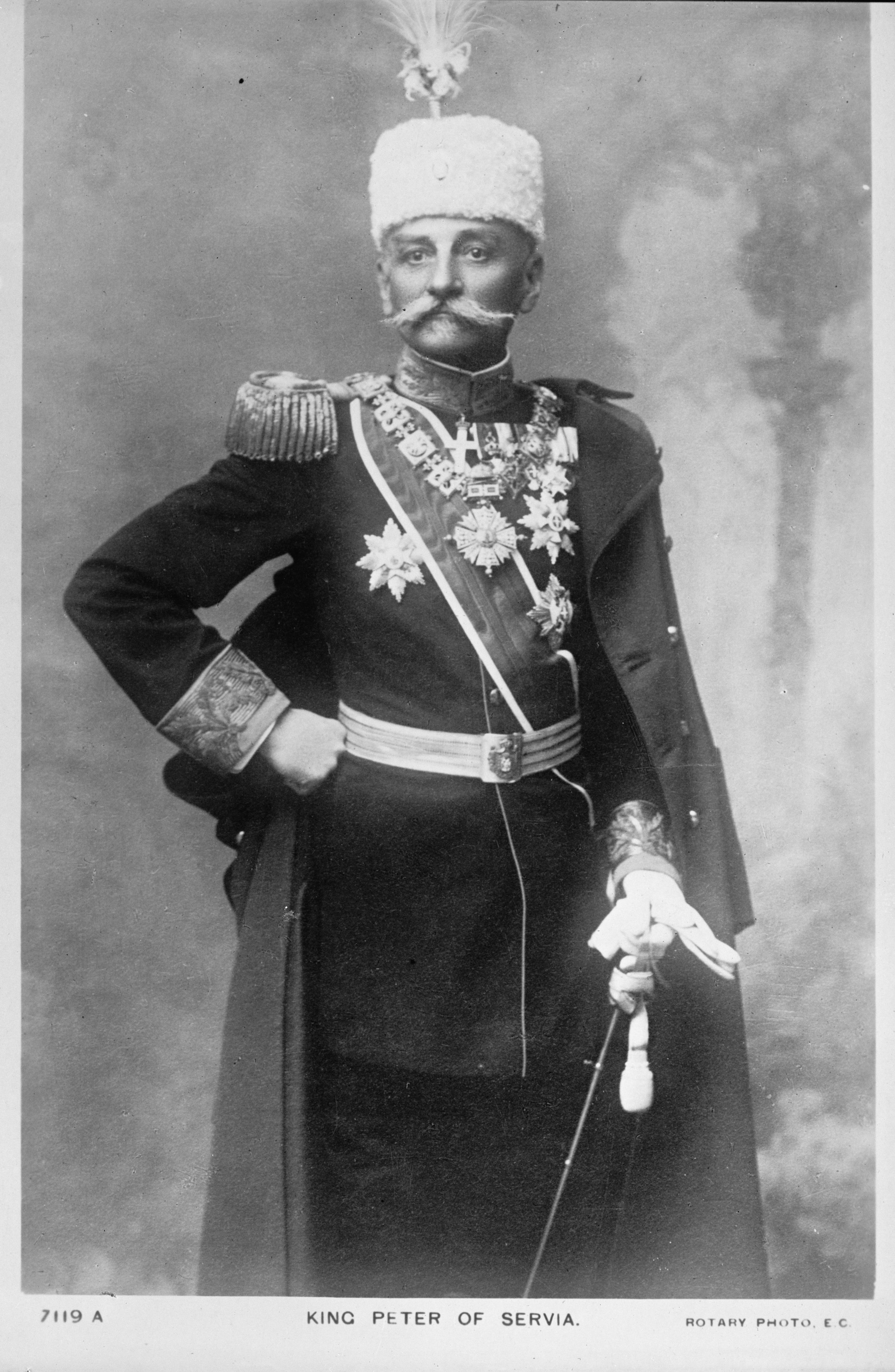
King Peter of Yugoslavia

- Prince Alexander, "the Unifier", became King of Yugoslavia following the death of his father, King Peter. At the time, Alexander was hospitalized in France at Neuilly-sur-Seine for appendicitis and announced that he would not be able to attend the funeral for his father in Belgrade, and was uncertain if he would be able to attend the ceremonies for his oath of accession to the throne, required to take place by August 26 or no more than ten days after the vacancy on the throne.
- Dáil Éireann, the first parliament to represent the people of an Irish Republic rather than the United Kingdom's Province of Southern Ireland, convened at the Mansion House in Dublin after being called into session by Éamon de Valera, despite the British position that it would not recognize a government that was not part of the United Kingdom of Great Britain and Ireland.
- The Times newspaper in London began a series of articles, written by its Constantinople correspondent Philip Graves, exposing The Protocols of the Elders of Zion as a forgery.
- The Soviet Union government announced a partial revocation of its policy of prohibition against the sale of alcohol and allowed the manufacture and sale of beverages containing up to 14% (or 28 proof) alcohol, such as light wine.
- Former U.S. President Woodrow Wilson formally resumed the practice of law as an attorney licensed to practice in the District of Columbia and in the federal courts, as he opened the offices of Wilson & Colby at 1315 F Street in Washington. Wilson's partner in his law firm was Bainbridge Colby, the former U.S. Secretary of State.
- Died: Peter I, King of Yugoslavia and former King of Serbia, 77

== August 17, 1921 (Wednesday) ==
- The treaty creating the Permanent Court of International Justice went into effect as Spain became the necessary 24th nation to ratify the agreement. Other signatory nations were the United Kingdom and its dominions, along with Albania, Austria, Denmark, Italy, the Netherlands, Sweden and Switzerland.

== August 18, 1921 (Thursday) ==
- British Prime Minister David Lloyd George convened a closed meeting of the British Cabinet to discuss whether the United Kingdom should continue its pursuit of the Balfour Declaration, the pledge to create a Jewish homeland in Palestine in the same area as the ancient Kingdom of Israel and Kingdom of Judah, or refer the Mandate for Palestine back to the League of Nations. The discussion was prompted by reports that had reached the office of Winston Churchill, the Secretary of State for the Colonies, that Arabs and Jews in the area were securing weapons for themselves to prepare for a conflict. The two options presented to the cabinet were to withdraw from the Declaration, to allow the League of Nations to stop Jewish immigration into the area and to create an Arab national government in Palestine; or to pursue the Declaration and to create an armed Jewish force. Ultimately, no decision was made at the meeting and the plan to create a Jewish state would continue.
- Born: Lydia Litvyak, Soviet fighter ace and the first woman pilot to shoot down an aircraft in combat; in Khrustalny, Ukraine (killed in combat, 1943)
- Died: Sir Samuel Cleland Davidson, 74, Irish engineer and inventor of the first air purification and cooling systems

== August 19, 1921 (Friday) ==
- The United Kingdom government published the Railways Act 1921, providing for the amalgamation of British railway companies into four large groups, "The Big Four", effective January 1, 1923.
- Sheriff's deputies in Knoxville, Tennessee, fired guns into a lynch mob that was attempting to storm the Knox County Jail, wounding 26 people, two of them seriously. The leaders of a white crowd, estimated at 3,000 people, demanded that the deputies allow them to enter the jail to remove Frank Martin, an African-American suspected of the sexual assault of a white schoolteacher. Sheriff William T. Cate confronted the crowd when it came within 100 feet (30 m) of the jail and "gave warning that an imaginary line between two telephone poles should not be crossed". When a dozen men defied the warning, Cate and four deputies with him fired shotguns into the air, and then were fired upon from four different people with revolvers, prompting the deputies to begin shooting.
- United States Steel Corporation cut wages for its employees for the third time since the year began, with mill workers to get 30 cents per hour effective August 29.
- Over 1,300 people had to be rescued from the Isle of Man passenger ferry King Orry after it ran aground at New Brighton, Cheshire. King Orry was refloated later that day.
- Born: Gene Roddenberry, U.S. screenwriter and producer, creator of Star Trek, in El Paso, Texas (d. 1991)
- Died: Dimitrios Rallis, 81, former Prime Minister of Greece who served five different times between 1897 and 1921

== August 20, 1921 (Saturday) ==
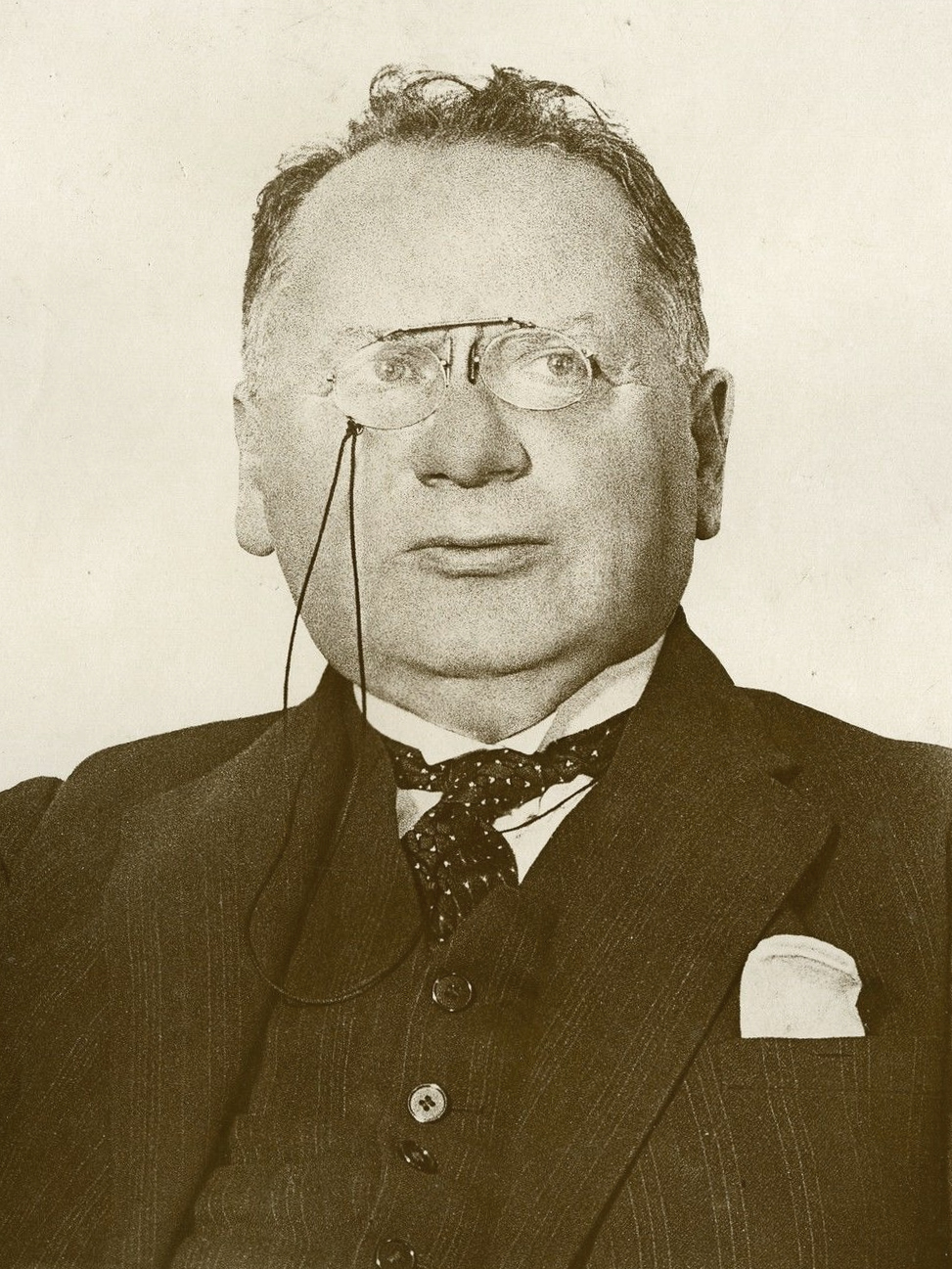
Litvinov

- Maxim Litvinov, Foreign Minister of the Soviet Union, signed the first agreement between the Soviets and the United States, which was represented by Walter Lloyd Brown of the American Relief Administration, after agreeing to the terms of the A.R.A. for humanitarian aid to relieve the Russian famine. The agreement took place at the office of Latvia Prime Minister Zigfrids Meierovics in Riga.
- The Malabar rebellion began with the murder of two British officers and nine Indian officials at Tirurangadi in British India. The attack took place in what is now the Kerala state as local Muslims forced Hindus to convert to Islam or be killed.
- The Baranya-Baja Republic was dissolved after just six days and its territory reintegrated with Hungary.
- Molla Mallory defeated her fellow American Mary Browne 4–6, 6–4, 6–2 to win her sixth women's singles title in the U.S. national championship tennis tournament.

== August 21, 1921 (Sunday) ==
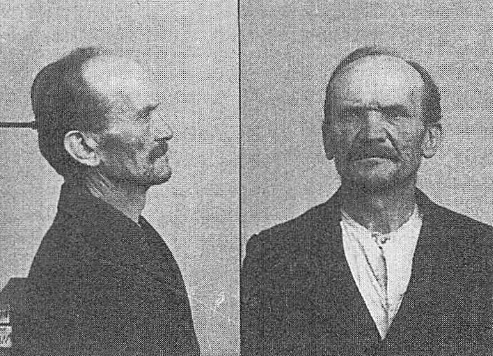
Großmann's mug shot

- Berlin police arrested German serial killer Carl Großmann at his apartment, after being called by his neighbors, and found the corpse of a woman, his last victim, on his bed. Großmann had killed and dismembered at least 20 women, and perhaps disposed of some of them in the course of selling sausage from a stall he operated on the Berlin streets. After testifying in his murder trial about the details of some of his murders, Großmann would hang himself in prison on July 5, 1922, before a verdict could be rendered.
- Three days before the scheduled launch of the U.S. dirigible ZR-2 in England, The Observer, London's Sunday newspaper, warned in an investigative report that ZR-2 had structural defects, including girders within the frame that had bent under the weight of the airship. The newspaper speculated that repair of the defects would take at least three weeks or the flight would have to be postponed until 1922.
- Born:
  - Gertrudis de la Fuente, Spanish biochemist (d. 2017)
  - Khwaja Hassan Askari, the last Nawab of Dhaka, later an East Pakistani and Bangladeshi government official; in Dacca, Bengal Province, British India (d. 1984)

== August 22, 1921 (Monday) ==
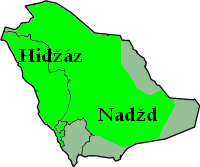
Nejd in western Saudi Arabia

- The Sultanate of Nejd, which would conquer and annex the neighboring Kingdom of Hejaz to create what is now Saudi Arabia, was proclaimed by the Emir of Riyadh, Abdul Aziz ibn Saud.
- From his hospital bed in Paris, King Alexander I of Yugoslavia took the oath of accession as required by the Yugoslavian Constitution to become the new monarch of the East European nation. "I proclaim to my dear people that I shall be faithful to my father's ideals and shall watch over the constitutional liberties and rights of citizens and defend the unity of the state," the new King said in a statement, and added, "Being prevented by illness from attending the obsequies of my father and exercising the royal authority, I charge my Cabinet to act for me in the exercise of the royal power... and to follow my instructions until my return to the country."
- In the aftermath of the Coto War between Panama and Costa Rica, Panamanian authorities evacuated the disputed town of Pueblo Nuevo de Coto, formed by the Panamanians on the banks of the Coto River but determined by an American commission to be in Costa Rican territory. A warning from U.S. Secretary of State Charles Evans Hughes led the Panamanians to yield the town to the Costa Ricans.
- The French passenger ship Cordillère was driven ashore on the Tungsha Spit, at the mouth of the Yangtze River in China, along with the British cargo ship Glaucus and the Norwegian cargo ship Henrik, in a typhoon. Cordillère's passengers and some of the crew were taken off on 24 August and all three ships were refloated on 5 September.

== August 23, 1921 (Tuesday) ==
- Faisal I bin Hussein bin Ali al-Hashemi was crowned King of Iraq in Baghdad, after being selected by the United Kingdom to rule the British Mandate of Iraq. He would reign until his death in 1933.
- The Battle of Sakarya, a turning point in the Greco-Turkish War, began near the city of Polatli between a Greek force of 120,000 soldiers and a Turkish defense force of over 96,000. The three week battle continued until September 13 when the Turks were able to force the surrender of the Greeks. Roughly 4,000 people died on each side.
- Great Britain announced that its population for 1921 was 42,767,530 of whom almost 17.5% (7,476,168) lived in the London metropolitan area. In addition, because of losses during the Great War, women outnumbered men in Britain by a margin of 22 million to 20 million.
- Born: Kenneth Arrow, American economist and mathematician, 1972 Nobel Prize in Economics winner; in New York City (d. 2017)
- Died: Maria Franciszka Kozłowska, 59, Polish Roman Catholic nun who in 1906 founded the Mariavite Church that split from Rome on the matter of clerical marriage.

== August 24, 1921 (Wednesday) ==
- The crash of the U.S. R38 dirigible ZR-2, the world's largest airship, killed 44 of its crew of 49. ZR-2 was on its fourth trial flight before its scheduled delivery to the U.S. Navy and had gone aloft at 7:00 in the morning. At 6:30 p.m., as the airship was returning to a landing at RNAS Howden in Yorkshire, it suffered a structural failure in midair, then exploded and crashed into the Humber Estuary. A subsequent investigation determined that the frame of girders buckled while the pilot was attempting to turn the airship at a speed of 50 miles per hour (80 km/h).
- The United States and Austria signed a treaty ending the state of war between the U.S. and the former Austro-Hungarian Empire.
- The Dow Jones Industrial Average, measure of the performance of the New York Stock Exchange reached a low point of 63.9 after a steady decline that had started on November 3, 1919. For the next eight years, the stock market would make a steady climb ending in August 1929, prior to the stock market crash of October 24, 1929.
- In the civil war following the coup d'état in Iran, rebel forces vacated Rasht as Cossack forces loyal to the government arrived.
- Died: Royal Air Force Commodore Edward Maitland, 41, British aviation pioneer, was killed in the crash of the R-38 airship Z-2.

== August 25, 1921 (Thursday) ==
- The U.S.–German Peace Treaty was signed in Berlin, bringing the First World War to an end for both parties and declaring that the state of war, which had begun on April 6, 1917, had terminated on July 2, 1921.
- Former Assistant U.S. Secretary of the Navy and future U.S. president Franklin D. Roosevelt, paralyzed from the waist down, was diagnosed with poliomyelitis by Dr Robert Lovett, a Boston specialist. On September 15, Roosevelt would be brought back by train from Campobello Island, where he had contracted polio, to the Presbyterian Hospital in New York City.
- The Battle of Blair Mountain began, in Logan County, West Virginia, United States, lasting until September 2. The armed confrontation was part of the Coal Wars, a series of disputes between coal-miners and employers in the region.

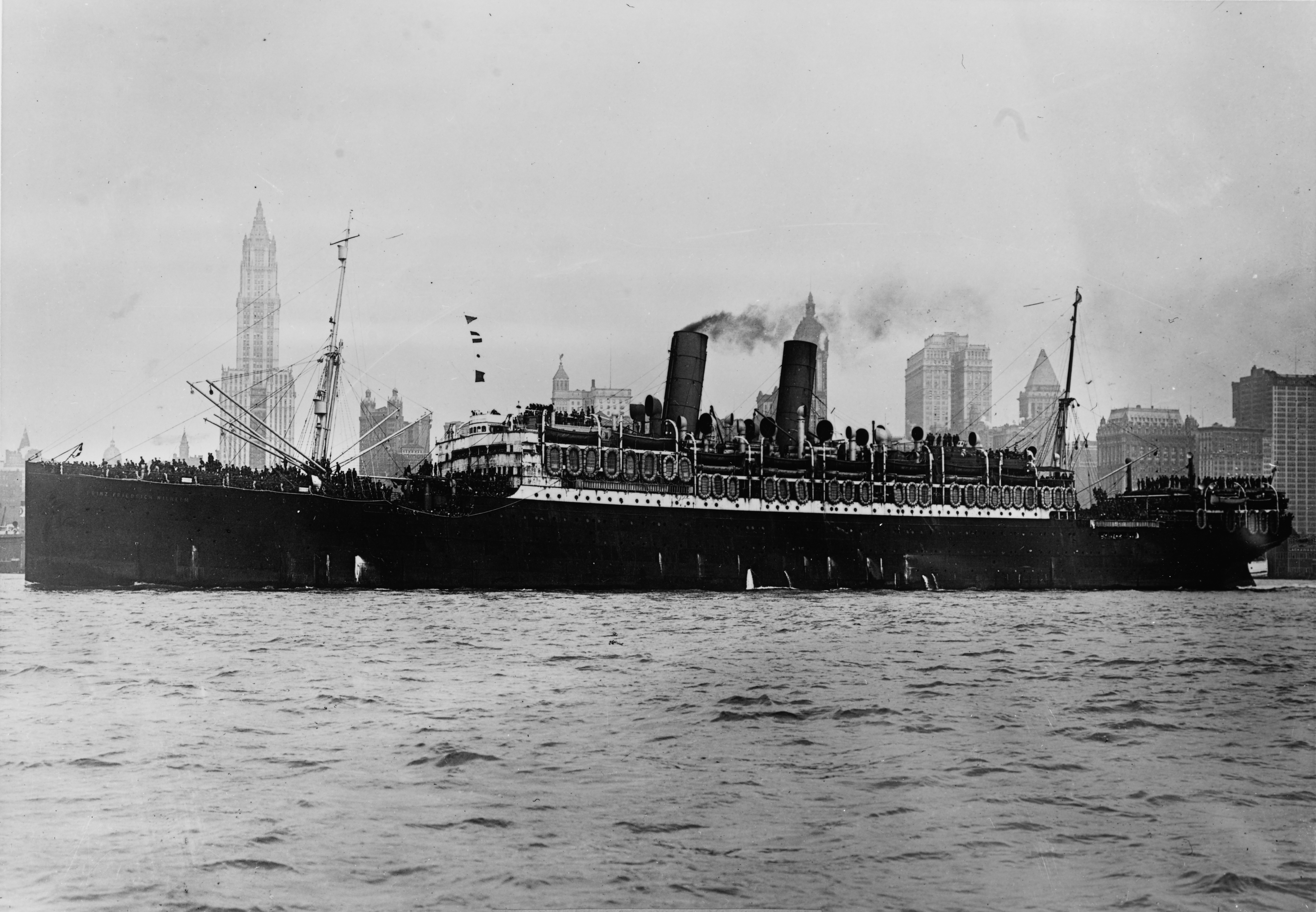
USS Prinz Friedrich Wilhelm

- The ocean liner SS Prinz Friedrich Wilhelm made its first voyage as a cruise ship since the outbreak of World War One in 1914. Having been surrendered by Germany to the United States, the ship was sold to the Canadian Pacific Line and renamed SS Empress of India and chartered by the Cunard line to travel from Southampton to New York.
- Born:
  - Monty Hall, Canadian-American TV game show host known for Let's Make a Deal; as Monte Halparin in Winnipeg, Manitoba (d. 2017)
  - Cardinal Paulos Tzadua, the first Ethiopian Roman Catholic cardinal and Archbishop of Addis Ababa; in Addi Fini, Eritrea (d. 2003)
  - U.S. Marine Corps General Edwin H. Simmons, American military officer and historian nicknamed "The Memory of the Marine Corps" for preserving the history of the USMC; in Billingsport, New Jersey (d. 2007).
- Died:
  - Peter Cooper Hewitt, 60, American scientist and inventor of the mercury vapor lamp
  - José Manuel Hernández, 68, Venezuelan politician and rebel leader, frequently unsuccessful presidential candidate
  - Major General James F. Wade (retired), 89. U.S. Army officer and commander of volunteer troops in the Spanish American War

== August 26, 1921 (Friday) ==
- Éamon de Valera resigned as President of Dáil Éireann and then asked the legislative body to formally elect him as the first President of the Irish Republic.
- The U.S. cargo ship City of Brunswick, on passage from Mobile, Alabama, to Antwerp with a cargo of grain and lumber, ran aground at Sambro Island, Halifax, Nova Scotia. It was abandoned and subsequently wrecked.

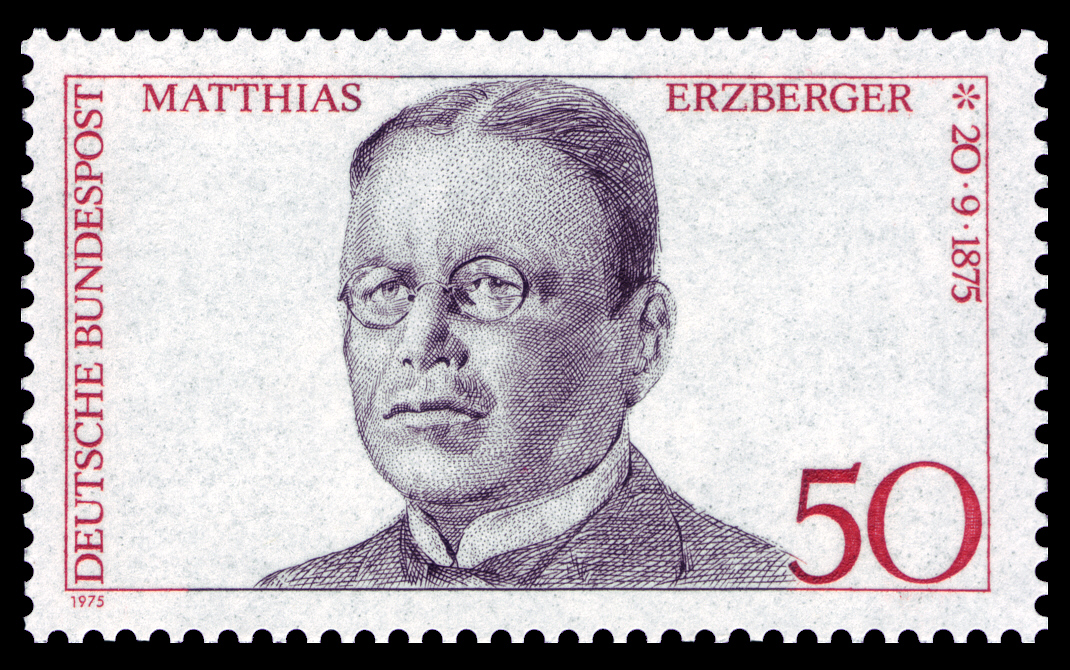
Erzberger

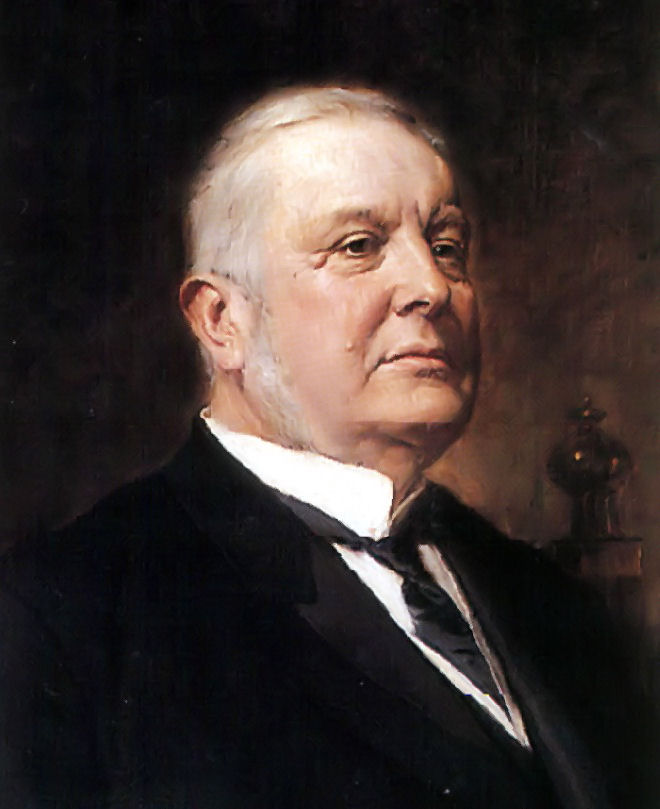
Wekerle

- Died:
  - Matthias Erzberger, 45, the former German Finance Minister, was assassinated at Bad Griesbach while on vacation in Germany's Black Forest. At 10:00 in the morning, while taking a walk with a fellow member of the Reichstag parliament, Erzberger was shot 12 times by right-wing terrorists Heinrich Tillessen and Heinrich Schulz, who had been recruited by Manfred von Killinger, a leading member of the Germanenorden.
  - Nikolay Gumilyov, 35, Russian Acmeist poet and political dissident, was executed with 61 other defendants convicted of involvement in the fabricated Tagantsev conspiracy.
  - Sándor Wekerle, 72, three time Prime Minister of Hungary

== August 27, 1921 (Saturday) ==
- At least 30 people were killed and more than 100 injured in the collision of a freight train and a passenger train near Magliano Romano, a short distance north of Rome.
- Born: Georg Alexander, Duke of Mecklenburg, German nobleman, future head of the House of Mecklenburg-Strelitz, in Nice, France (d. 1996)
- Died: Friedrich Schumann, 28, German serial killer convicted of the murder of seven people, was beheaded at the Plötzensee Prison by Prussian executioner Carl Gröpler, who lopped off the convict's head with one blow of his axe.

== August 28, 1921 (Sunday) ==
- On the day that the disputed territory of Burgenland, an area of the former Austro-Hungarian Empire claimed after World War One by both Austria and Hungary, was to be awarded to Austria pursuant to the Treaty of Trianon, Hungarian insurgents led by a Captain Hejjas occupied the town of Ödenburg and battled Austrian soldiers at the towns of Agendorf and Pinkafeld.
- Portugal's Prime Minister Tomé de Barros Queirós and his cabinet resigned after a dispute over whether "milicianos" —veteran military officers who had been drafted into the service and promoted (as opposed to those who had volunteered for the serve and completed officer training)— should be required to go through the training program.
- Moroccan Rif tribesmen at El Araish (called Larache by the Spanish occupiers), rebelled and killed 200 Spanish Army troops stationed in the garrison at Arba-el-Kola. The garrison would soon be recaptured by Spain.
- Troops of the Army of Nicaragua fought a battle against rebels who had come across the northern border from Honduras and reached the town of El Sauce.
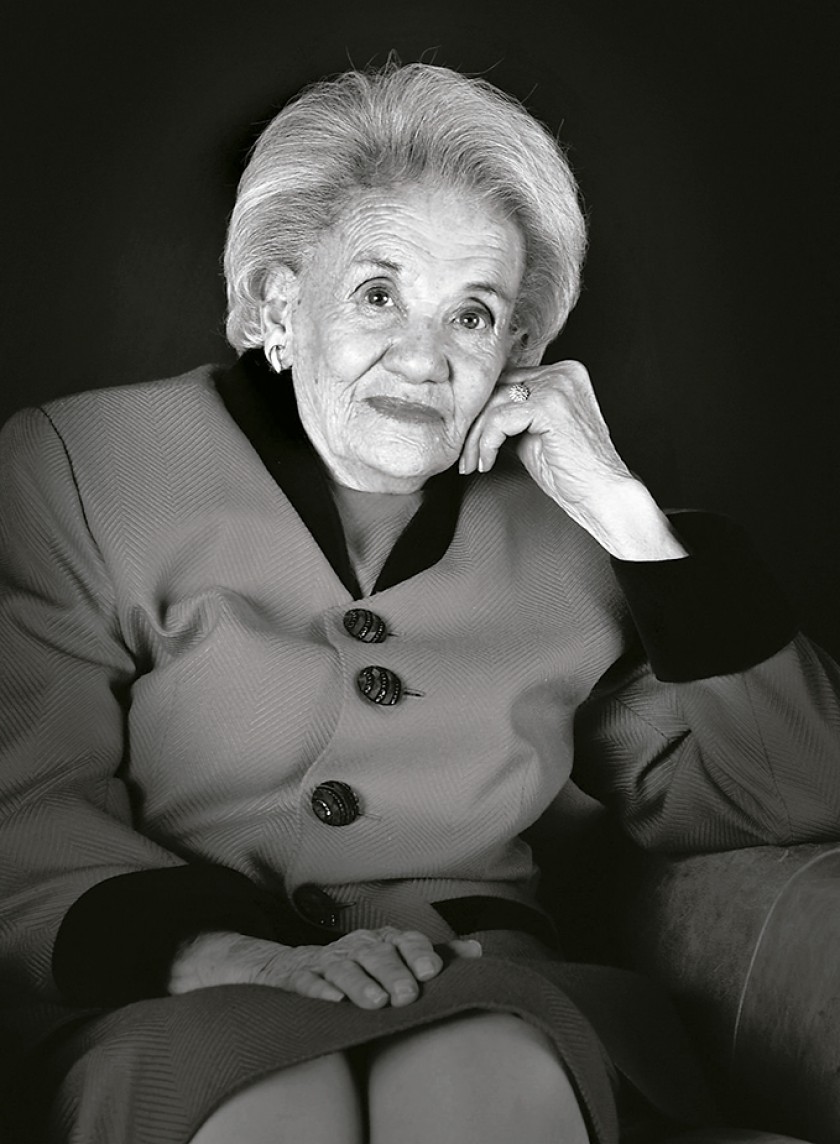
  Bolivian President Gueiler
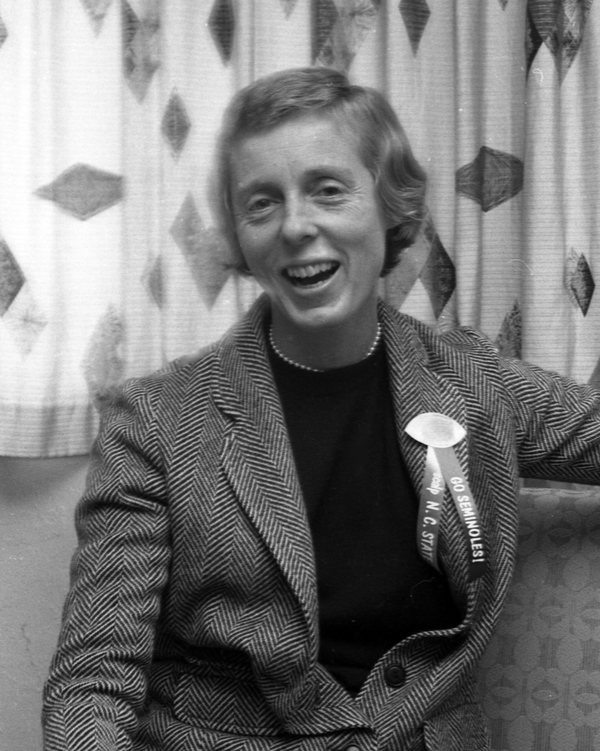
  Actress Kulp
- Born:
  - Lidia Gueiler Tejada, first female President of Bolivia, in Cochabamba (d. 2011)
  - Nancy Kulp, American comedienne and character actress best known for portraying "Miss Hathaway" on The Beverly Hillbillies; in Harrisburg, Pennsylvania (d. 1991)
- Died: Frederick Upham Adams, 62, American author and inventor of the electric light post

== August 29, 1921 (Monday) ==
- Loew's State Theatre, with 3,600 seats, opened in New York City as the brainchild of motion picture pioneer Marcus Loew, owner of MGM. Guests at the gala opening night included Ethel and Lionel Barrymore, Theda Bara, Billie Burke, Douglas Fairbanks and Mary Pickford.
- Born: Iris Apfel, American businesswoman and fashion icon; in Queens, New York (d. 2024)
- Died: Joel Asaph Allen, 83, American ornithologist

== August 30, 1921 (Tuesday) ==
- After thousands of striking union coal miners, and strikebreakers hired by mining companies in the U.S. state of West Virginia were armed and prepared to fight each other, U.S. President Warren G. Harding issued a proclamation giving the miners a 48-hour ultimatum, directing them to disperse by noon on September 1, and announcing that he was prepared to send U.S. Army troops and to declare martial law in five West Virginia counties affected by the violence.
- Legislative elections were held in the Australian state of Victoria. Premier Harry Lawson's minority Nationalist government remained the largest party and maintained the existing coalition.
- 8,000 Austrian troops arrived at Burgenland held by Hungarian insurgents, but failed to take control of Ödenburg. While Pinkafeld remained part of Austria, the showdown would ultimately prompt the League of Nations to sponsor the Sopron plebiscite in December for villages in the disputed Burgenland area.
- Commerce Minister António Granjo formed a new Portuguese government.

== August 31, 1921 (Wednesday) ==
- The Australian Air Force officially took the prefix "Royal", becoming the second Royal air arm to be formed in the British Commonwealth, after Britain's Royal Air Force.
