= July 1921 =

Month of 1921

| << | July 1921 | | | | | >> |
| Su | Mo | Tu | We | Th | Fr | Sa |
| | | | | | 1 | 2 |
| 3 | 4 | 5 | 6 | 7 | 8 | 9 |
| 10 | 11 | 12 | 13 | 14 | 15 | 16 |
| 17 | 18 | 19 | 20 | 21 | 22 | 23 |
| 24 | 25 | 26 | 27 | 28 | 29 | 30 |
| 31 |

The following events occurred in July 1921:

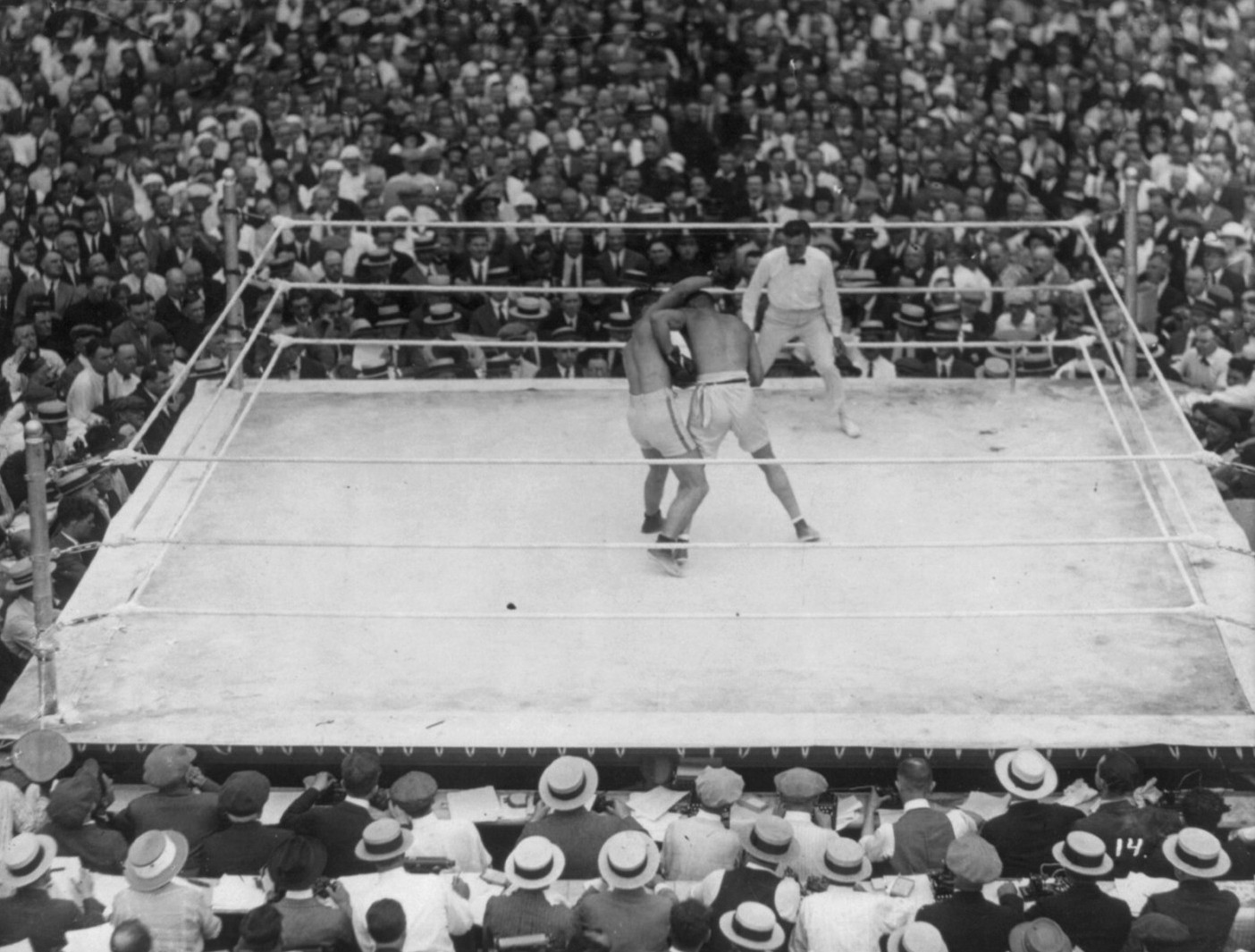
July 2, 1921: Dempsey defeats Carpentier in a "Fight of the Century"

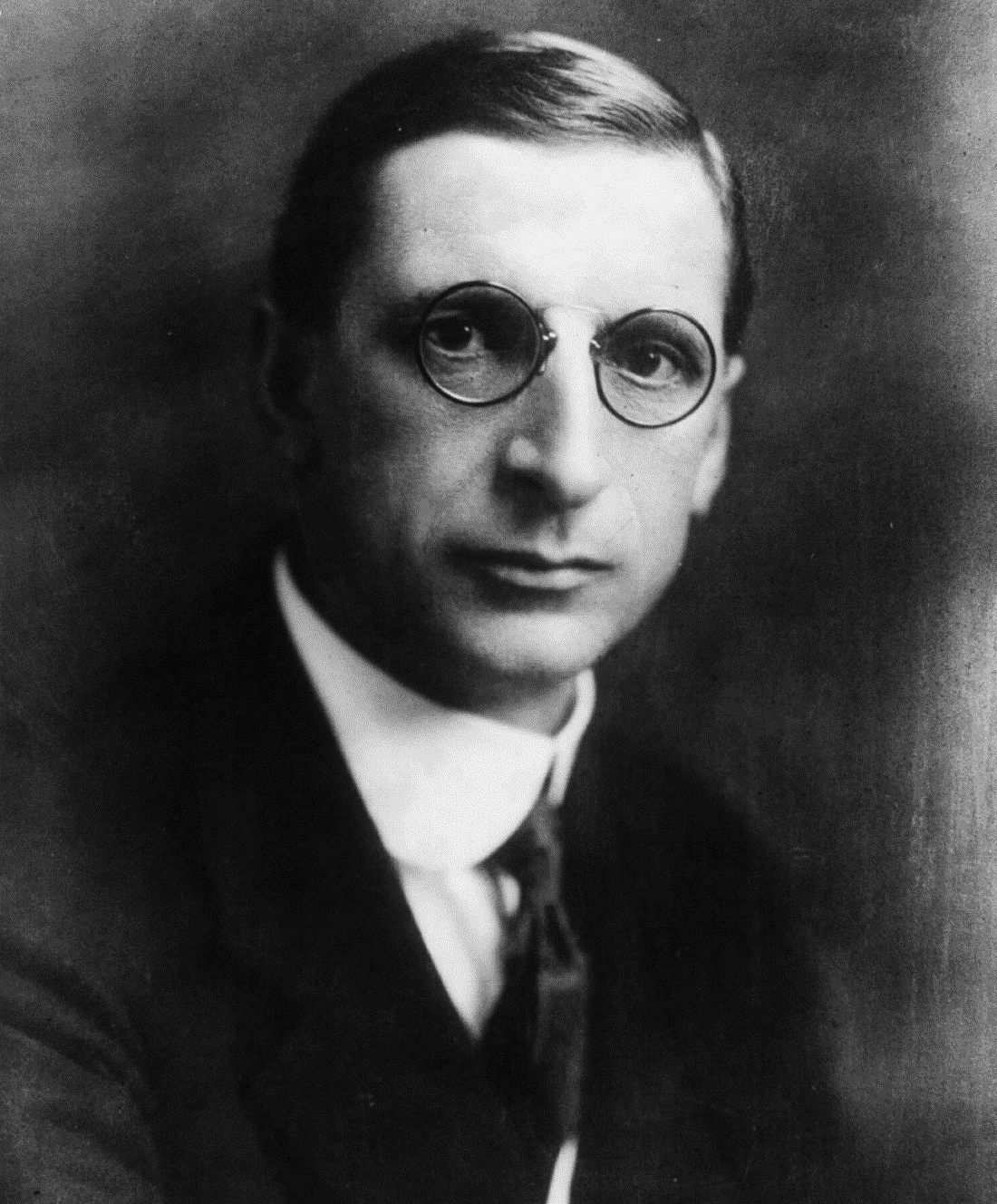
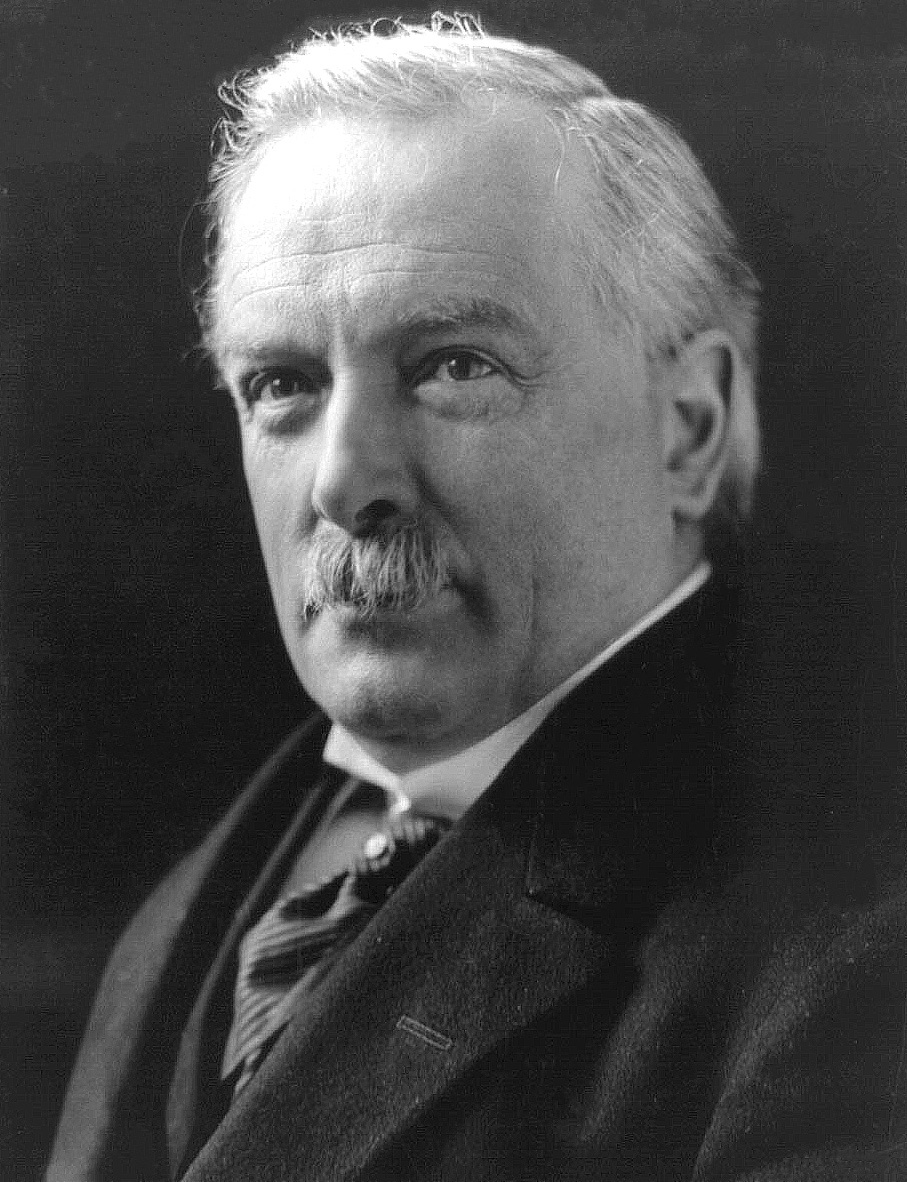
July 8, 1921: Ireland's De Valera and the UK's Lloyd George agree on truce

== July 1, 1921 (Friday) ==
- The Chinese Communist Party was founded.
- The silent crime docudrama Yan Ruisheng became the first full-length feature film made in China to be released. Although commercially successful it was banned within 2 years and believed lost.
- Mexico's increased tariff on the export of petroleum products went into effect. In response, oil production came to a halt and employees of oil refineries and drilling sites were laid off from work.
- British troops arrived in Upper Silesia to support French forces in occupying the region, to maintain order in the wake of the Upper Silesia plebiscite.
- Britain's striking miners voted to approve a settlement proposed by the British government. The House of Commons then voted a subsidy of ten million pounds sterling to the mining industry to cover the pay increase.
- The U.S.-registered EDC Design 1023 cargo ship Mopang was sunk by a mine at the entrance to Burgas Bay in the Black Sea.
- Born: Seretse Khama, Motswana politician, the first President of Botswana; in Serowe, Bechuanaland (now Botswana) (d. 1980)

== July 2, 1921 (Saturday) ==
- In the U.S., the first “million dollar gate” in the sport of boxing took place in Jersey City, New Jersey, when Jack Dempsey met Georges Carpentier in front of crowd of 90,000. Dempsey won with a fourth-round knockout in a scheduled 12-round fight which was broadcast on radio, with ringside commentary relayed over the new radiophone to people in the northeastern United States.
- U.S. President Warren G. Harding signed the Knox-Porter Resolution, ending America's war with Germany, Austria and Hungary.
- The 1921 Wimbledon tennis championships concluded with the American Bill Tilden defeating South African Brian Norton in the final of the Men's Singles.
- Born: Andrei S. Monin, Soviet Russian physicist and mathematician known for the Monin–Obukhov length measurement and the Monin–Obukhov similarity theory; in Moscow, Russian SFSR (d. 2007)

== July 3, 1921 (Sunday) ==
- The Icelandic Order of the Falcon (Hin Islenska Fálkaorða), the only order of chivalry in Iceland, was created by proclamation of King Christian X. At the time, the Danish–Icelandic Act of Union of 1918 had recently established the sovereign Kingdom of Iceland (Konungsríkið Ísland) as separate from Denmark but ruled by the same monarch. In his capacity as King of Iceland, Christian visited Reykjavík and announced the uniquely Icelandic honor, which would continue after Iceland's independence from Denmark as a republic in 1944.
- The Founding Congress of the Red International of Trade Unions, an international organization of labor unions with Communist members, was convened in Moscow with 380 delegates from multiple nations. Based on the Russian word for a trade union (profsoyuzov) and internatsional, the organization was called Profintern and would exist until 1937.
- Died:
  - Viktor von Lang, 83, Austrian chemist, pioneer of crystal physics (b. 1838)
  - Prince Philipp of Saxe-Coburg and Gotha, 77, French-born member of the German royal family (b. 1844)

== July 4, 1921 (Monday) ==
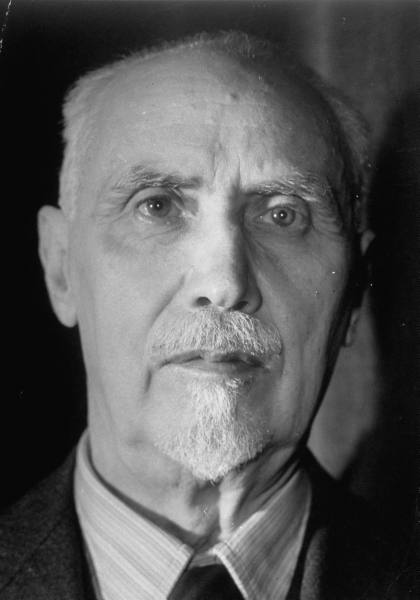
Ivanoe Bonomi, new Prime Minister of Italy

- Ivanoe Bonomi became Prime Minister of Italy and formed a new government.
- Ireland's President Éamon de Valera held a peace conference at the Mansion House, Dublin, which was attended by the Earl of Midleton, and other southern Unionists. James Craig, the first Prime Minister of Northern Ireland, declined an invitation to the conference because it was wrongly addressed.
- U.S. warships were anchored off of the coast of Tampico as a precaution against unemployment rioting after the shutdown of oil refineries. The ships were ordered by the U.S. Navy to return to the U.S. on July 8.
- Born: Dudar Hahanov, Soviet Georgian composer, violinist and conductor; in Tskhinvali, Georgian SSR (present-day Georgia) (d. 1995)
- Died: Antoni Grabowski, 64, Polish engineer known for being fluent in Esperanto (b. 1857)

== July 5, 1921 (Tuesday) ==
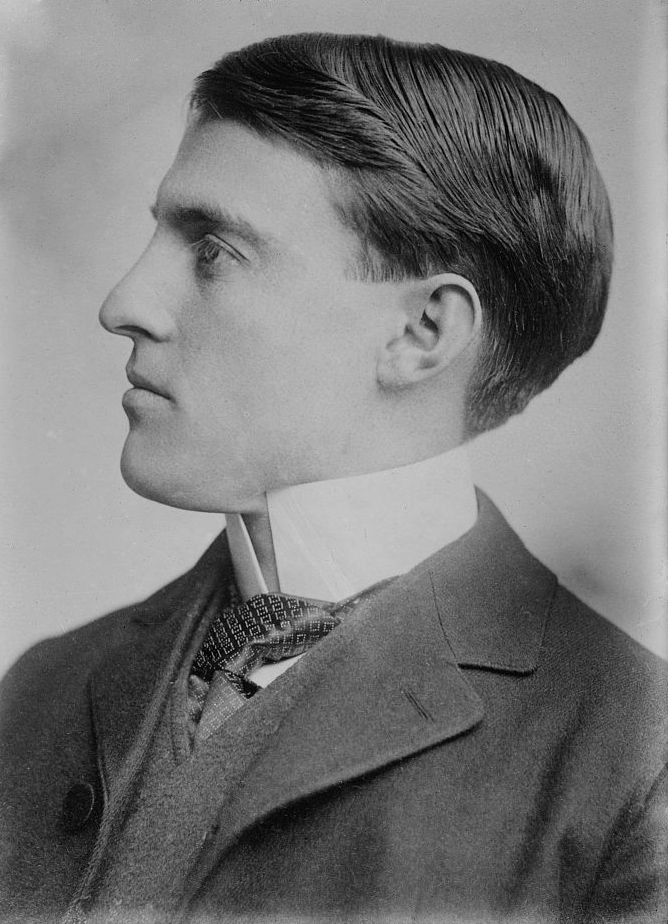
Miller Reese Hutchison

- American inventor Miller Reese Hutchison, the former chief engineer to Thomas Edison, demonstrated his new noiseless and smokeless weapon in a press conference at the Woolworth Building, capable of firing a projectile at speeds of up to five miles (8 km) per second, equivalent to 18,000 miles per hour (29,000 km/h). Hutchison claimed that a larger version of the cannon could be adapted to fire a shell weighing five tons — 10,000 pounds (4,500 kg) — a distance of up to 300 miles (480 km).
- South Africa's Prime Minister Jan Smuts conferred with Republicans and Unionists meeting at Dublin and suggested a proposal to remove barriers to a meeting in London.

== July 6, 1921 (Wednesday) ==
- At the Leipzig War Crimes Trials in Germany, General Karl Stenger was acquitted of charges of murdering prisoners-of-war during World War I. His subordinate, Major Bruno Crusius, was convicted of manslaughter and sentenced to two years in prison.
- Japanese troops killed 500 Koreans who they claimed had joined the Soviet Bolsheviks.
- Members of the recently formed Arditi del Popolo, an Italian anti-fascist movement, were arrested by police in Rome.
- The two-day world Christian Endeavor conference opened in New York City with 16,000 delegates from around the world. The convention closed the next day with a resolution encouraging worldwide disarmament with the goal of "A Warless World in 1923".
- Born: Nancy Reagan, actress and First Lady of the United States; as Anne Frances Robbins, in New York City (d. 2016)

== July 7, 1921 (Thursday) ==
- In a move criticized by observers as corrupt, Delaware's Governor William D. Denney appointed a Republican U.S. Senator after persuading the incumbent Democrat Senator to vacate the seat in order to be appointed the Attorney General (or Chancellor) of Delaware. Josiah O. Wolcott, in his first term as U.S. Senator, had resigned on July 2 in return for being given the state post, and Denney then appointed multi-millionaire and retired General T. Coleman du Pont to serve the remainder of Wolcott's term. The change of seats gave the Republican Party a 60 to 36 majority in the U.S. Senate.
- A U.S. Navy dirigible, C-3, caught fire in mid-air while flying at an altitude of 400 feet (120 m) above the Naval Air Station Hampton Roads in Norfolk, Virginia. The pilot, O. O. Atwood, was able to make a safe landing and the other five persons on board were able to escape before the hydrogen inside the dirigible exploded.
- Louise McIlroy, Professor of Obstetrics and Gynaecology at the Royal Free Hospital for Women, delivered a paper at the Medico-Legal Society London, and described the contraceptives dispensed at Marie Stopes Mothers' Clinic as the "most harmful method of which I have experience." Dr Halliday Sutherland would quote her words in his 1922 book Birth Control. When Stopes sued Sutherland for libel, McIlroy testified for the defence.
- Born: Ezzard Charles, American boxer and world heavyweight champion 1949-1951; in Lawrenceville, Georgia (d. 1975)

== July 8, 1921 (Friday) ==
- At the conclusion of the Dublin Conference, a truce between British troops and Irish Republicans was announced by Irish Republican leader Éamon de Valera and British Prime Minister David Lloyd George in Dublin and in London, respectively, scheduled to take effect at noon on Monday, July 11. The truce came in conjunction with De Valera's response to Lloyd George's invitation to discuss a peace treaty in London. De Valera wrote in his reply, "Sir: The desire you expressed on the part of the British Government to end the centuries of conflict between the peoples of these two islands and to establish relations of neighborly harmony is the genuine desire of the people of Ireland. I have consulted with my colleagues... in regard to the invitation you have sent me. In reply I desire to say that I am ready to meet and discuss with you on what basis such a conference as that proposed can reasonably hope to achieve the object desired." The British Government then announced, "In accordance with the Prime Minister's offer and Mr. de Valera's reply, arrangements are being made for hostilities to cease from Monday next, July 11, at noon."
- The Land O'Lakes agricultural cooperative was founded in Saint Paul, Minnesota, by 320 producers to promote the marketing of butter, initially named the Minnesota Cooperative Creameries Association.
- The U.S. and Canadian Joint Commission reported that the proposed St. Lawrence Seaway canal linking the Great Lakes to the Atlantic Ocean could be constructed at a cost of $252,278,200.
- U.S. warships anchored off of the coast of Tampico to protect against unrest were ordered to return to the U.S.
- France's observers at Germany's war crime trials departed from Leipzig after declaring that the German trials were "a farce."
- An intense heat wave, with high humidity and temperatures, affected most of the United States east of the Rocky Mountains.
- The Agreement Between Great Britain and Sweden Relating to the Suppression of the Capitulations in Egypt was concluded in Stockholm.
- Labour candidate Walter Halls won a by-election in the UK parliamentary constituency of Heywood and Radcliffe, by a majority of just over 300 votes.
- Born: John Money, New Zealand psychologist and sexologist, known for controversial sexual identity study on David Reimer; in Morrinsville (d. 2006)

== July 9, 1921 (Saturday) ==
- Mongolia declared its independence from China during the Mongolian Revolution.
- In a "man-driven airplane", French aviator Gabriel Poulain was able to fly at least one meter off the ground for a distance of at least 10 meters, winning the Peugeot Prize of 10,000 French francs. The pedal-powered aircraft, Aviette, weighed 37 pounds (17 kg) while unoccupied.
- Former world heavyweight boxing champion Jack Johnson was released from the federal prison in Leavenworth, Kansas, after serving 10 months of his sentence for his 1913 conviction under the Mann Act. U.S. President Donald Trump would issue a posthumous presidential pardon to Johnson on May 24, 2018.

== July 10, 1921 (Sunday) ==
- In parliamentary elections in Portugal, the Republican Liberal Party won 79 seats, just short of an overall majority.
- Hours before the July 11 truce between Republican and Union forces, "Bloody Sunday" took place as a unit of the Irish Republican Army attacked an armored police truck in Belfast and killed an officer. In retaliation, Protestant loyalists attacked the Catholic population, of Belfast, killing 17 people.
- Five bystanders were killed and 14 seriously injured at a park in Moundsville, West Virginia, when a Martin MB-1 bomber airplane crashed into a crowd and into parked cars. Although the pilots of the plane escaped unharmed, a mechanic in the crew died. Sixteen automobiles were set ablaze, killing some of the victims.
- U.S. President Harding announced that the leaders of the Allied nations (the United Kingdom, France, Japan and Italy) would be invited to a world disarmament conference to be held in Washington on November 11. UK Prime Minister Lloyd George announced in Commons the next day that his cabinet was in favor of accepting the invitation, and France and Italy accepted on July 12. Japan accepted tentatively on July 13, but stated that it would not discuss questions concerning disarmament in the Pacific Ocean.
- Born: Eunice Kennedy Shriver, American philanthropist, daughter of Joseph P. Kennedy Sr. and Rose Fitzgerald; as Eunice Mary Kennedy; in Brookline, Massachusetts (d. 2009)
- Died: William Craven, 4th Earl of Craven, 52, British yachtsman and socialite, drowned in The Solent after falling overboard from his boat, the Sylvia. (b. 1868)

== July 11, 1921 (Monday) ==
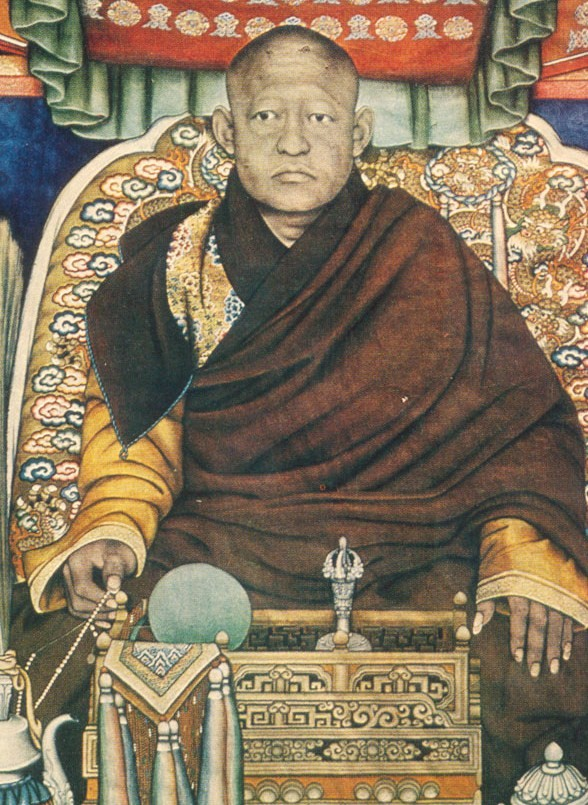
The Bogd Khan, ruler of Mongolia

- Bringing an end to the Irish War of Independence, a ceasefire took effect at noon on agreement between the British Government, led by Prime Minister David Lloyd George, and the proposed president of the Republic of Ireland, Éamon de Valera. Lloyd George informed the House of Commons that De Valera would come to London for a conference on July 14.
- The Bogd Khan was restored as constitutional ruler of Mongolia and was enthroned in a special ceremony.
- Former U.S. President William Howard Taft was sworn in as Chief Justice of the United States, after having been appointed by U.S. President Harding and confirmed by the Senate.
- U.S. President Harding signed the Naval Appropriation Bill, reducing spending on the U.S. Navy from $496 million to $410 million.
- The U.S.-registered steamship Western Front, carrying 7,000 tons of naval stores, including naphtha, turpentine and resin from Jacksonville to London, foundered several miles west of the Isles of Scilly after an explosion and fire that killed one crew member.
- The world Christian Endeavor conference closed with a resolution encouraging worldwide disarmament with the goal of "A Warless World in 1923".

== July 12, 1921 (Tuesday) ==
- Beginning at 3:00 in the afternoon local time, the first radio broadcast in Sweden was made, transmitted from the city of Boden with a signal that could be heard in Stockholm.
- The Spanish passenger ship Manuel L. Villaverde struck rocks off the coast of Colonial Nigeria, broke in two and sank. All those on board were rescued.
- U.S. baseball player Babe Ruth tied and then broke the record for career home runs in the same game, surpassing Roger Connor's record of 136. Ruth would continue to break his own record, finishing his career with 714 homers, a mark that would stand until being broken by Hank Aaron in 1974. Despite Ruth's effort, the New York Yankees still lost to the host St. Louis Browns, 6 to 4.
- Died: Harry Hawker, 32, Australian test pilot and aircraft designer, was killed in the crash of his Nieuport Nighthawk airplane shortly after takeoff from the Hendon Aerodrome near London (b. 1889)

== July 13, 1921 (Wednesday) ==
- The Anglo-Japanese Alliance of 1902 expired while the 1921 Imperial Conference was in progress.
- U.S. Army planes, in a project promoted by General Billy Mitchell, bombed and sank a former German Navy destroyer SMS G102 off of the coast of Cape Henry, Virginia. The empty ship, surrendered to the U.S. after World War I, went down only 20 minutes after aerial bombardment began after being struck by 51 bombs, each with 300 pounds (140 kg) or explosives.
- The Southern Ireland parliament convened in Dublin, but with only 12 senators and only two members of its House showing up.
- U.S. Secretary of War John W. Weeks announced the firing of 21,174 civilian employees in order to save over $225 million per year in salaries and benefits.
- Born: Kenneth Utt, American film producer and actor; in Winston-Salem, North Carolina (d. 1994)
- Died: Gabriel Lippmann, 75, French physicist and pioneer in color photography and 1908 Nobel Prize in Physics laureate (b. 1845)

== July 14, 1921 (Thursday) ==
- In a controversial trial in the U.S., Italian anarchists Nicola Sacco and Bartolomeo Vanzetti were found guilty of murder by a court in Dedham, Massachusetts. On April 15, 1920, factory paymaster Frederic A. Parmenter and security guard Alessandro Berardelli had been shot and killed during the theft of $15,776.17 of cash being taken to the Slater and Morrill Shoes factory and the two defendants had been charged with the crime.
- Ireland's republican leader, Éamon de Valera, conferred with British Prime Minister David Lloyd George for two hours in London. Lloyd George then met with King George V to inform him of the results.
- Myron T. Herrick, the new U.S. ambassador to France, arrived in Paris for the Bastille Day celebrations, to be greeted by Prime Minister Aristide Briand, although the annual review of troops due to take place on that day had been cancelled because of a heatwave.
- Born: Sixto Durán Ballén, U.S.-born Ecuadorian politician who served as the president of Ecuador from 1992 to 1996; in Boston (d. 2016)

== July 15, 1921 (Friday) ==
- In the Greco-Turkish War, Greek forces reoccupied Afyonkarahisar, in present-day Turkey.
- After being rammed by the British ship Harmodius, the U.S. schooner E. Marie Brown sank in the Atlantic Ocean 30 nautical miles (56 km) east of Fire Island, New York, with the loss of four crew members.
- The ex-German torpedo boat V43, allocated to the United States under the Treaty of Versailles, was sunk as a target off Cape Henry by the U.S. battleship Florida. Shortly before, SMS S-132 had been sunk by the U.S. Navy destroyer USS Herbert and the dreadnought USS Delaware.

== July 16, 1921 (Saturday) ==
- The sixth annual Aerial Derby, sponsored by the Royal Aero Club of Great Britain, was won by J. H. James, who completed the course in a Gloster Mars at an average speed of 163.34 mph (262.87 km/h) in 1 hour 18 minutes 10 seconds with a handicap of 4 minutes 42 seconds.
- The Soviet government issued an appeal to its people to aid 10 million victims of starvation in Astrakhan, Tsaritsyn, Saratov, Samara, Simbirsk, Ufa and Vyatka, along with villages in the Volga River valley and in Chuvash.
- In the Greco-Turkish War, Greek troops seized control of the strategically-located city of Kutaiah from Turkish control.
- The U.S. paid $32,688,352 to the United Kingdom for British expenses in the transportation of American soldiers during World War I.
- The International Women's Congress, presided over by Jane Addams of the U.S., opened in Vienna.
- Born:
  - Guy Laroche, French fashion designer; in La Rochelle, Charente-Inférieure département (d. 1989)
  - Henri Spade, French television journalist and producer; in Paris, France (d. 2008)
- Died: Arthur Irwin, 63, Canadian-American sportsman, Major League Baseball player and manager who perfected the baseball glove, later served as the president of the American League of Professional Football, committed suicide by jumping overboard the passenger ship Calvin Austin (b. 1858)

== July 17, 1921 (Sunday) ==
- The unrecognized Republic of Mirdita was proclaimed in northern Albania by Marka Gjoni.
- Cantonese troops, under the command of former Republic of China President Sun Yat-sen, who had proclaimed the "Extraordinary Government of China", reported victory in a war in the provinces of Guangxi and Guangdong.
- Japan announced its terms for recognition of the newly proclaimed Far Eastern Republic within the borders of the Soviet Union, including indemnities for the families of Japanese citizens who had been killed in Siberia, along with the outlawing of communism.
- Died: Winthrop E. Stone, 59, American professor of chemistry and President of Purdue University, made the first successful ascent of the 10,843 feet (3,305 m) Eon Mountain in the Canadian Rockies, but fell to his death as he made his way back down the peak (b. 1862)

== July 18, 1921 (Monday) ==
- The BCG vaccine for tuberculosis was administered to a patient for the first time, in Paris, France, by Benjamin Weill-Halle.
- U.S. baseball player Babe Ruth hit the longest home run in the history of Major League Baseball while in Detroit for a game in a 10 to 1 victory by his New York Yankees and the host Detroit Tigers. Ruth's hit cleared the roof of Tiger Stadium and landed in the street, 560 feet (170 m) away.
- U.S. Army airplanes bombed the former German battle cruiser SMS Frankfurt off of the coast of Virginia and sank it within 26 minutes.
- In the general election in the Canadian province of Alberta, the United Farmers of Alberta defeated the incumbent Liberals.
- An appeal by writer Maxim Gorky on behalf of Russian famine victims was published in international media.
- The new U.S. cargo ship SS City of Brunswick departed Tampa, Florida, on her maiden voyage. The ship quickly developed problems and was wrecked a month later.
- Born: John Glenn, American astronaut and politician, known for being the first American to orbit the Earth and later as U.S. Senator for Ohio; in Cambridge, Ohio(d. 2016)

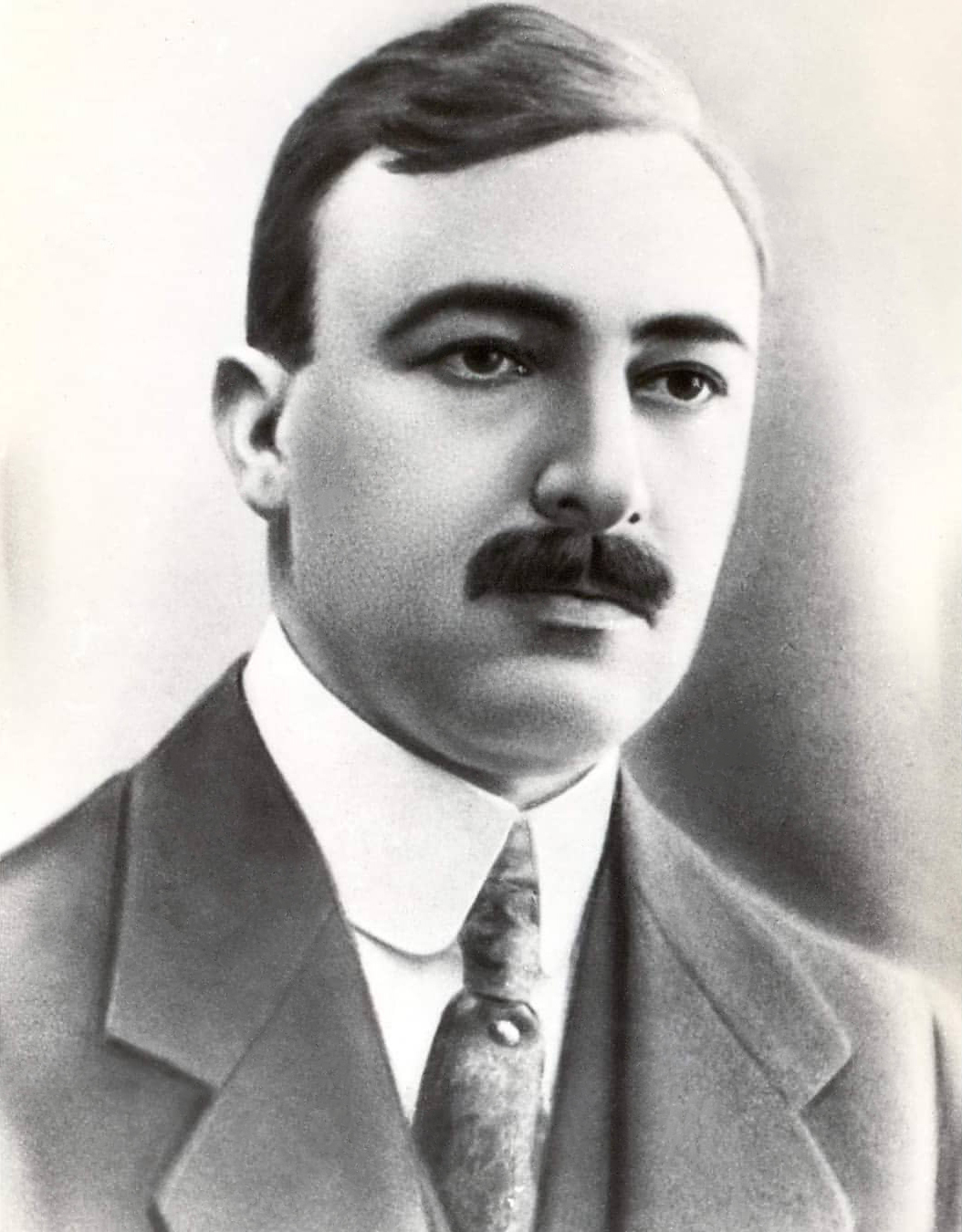
Minister Behbud Khan Javanshir

- Died: Behbud Khan Javanshir, 43, Azerbaijani Minister of Internal Affairs in charge of the policing of the Azerbaijan Democratic Republic; assassinated by Misak Torlakian in an act of retaliation for the Ministry's persecution of Armenians in Azerbaijan (b. 1878)

== July 19, 1921 (Tuesday) ==
- The last horse-drawn fire engine in a major U.S. city, operated by Engine Company 24 of the Los Angeles Fire Department (LAFD), was retired as the LAFD went to all motorized trucks.
- Born: Rosalyn Sussman Yalow, American medical physicist, 1977 Nobel Prize laureate known for her development of the radioimmunoassay test; in New York City (d. 2011)
- Died: Lily Atkinson, 55, New Zealand suffragist, died of uraemia. (b. 1866)

== July 20, 1921 (Wednesday) ==
- France informed the United Kingdom that it would decline the British request for an immediate conference on the Silesian boundary between Germany and Poland. Instead, France intended to send more troops to the area. France reversed its decision six days later.
- The Governor and the Lieutenant Governor of Illinois, Len Small and Fred E. Sterling, were both indicted by a grand jury on charges of embezzling public funds and conspiracy to defraud the state. Both had served as the Illinois State Treasurer in the past.

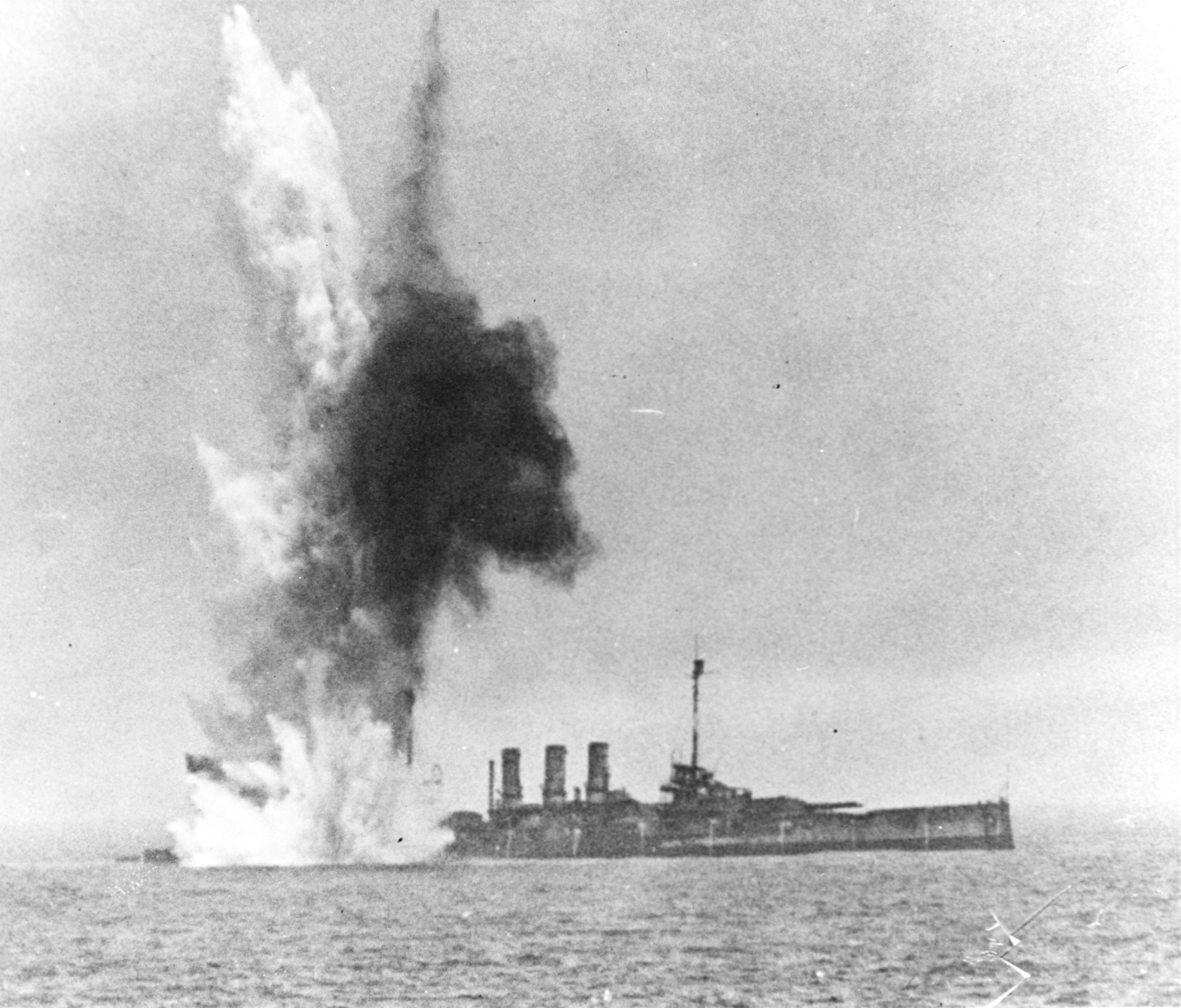
A bomb misses SMS Ostfriesland

- A group of 15 pilots of the U.S. Army, Navy and Marines carried out final aerial bombardment of a retired German warship, choosing the largest of the ships surrendered to the U.S. as part of German reparations, the dreadnought SMS Ostfriesland. U.S. Secretary of War John W. Weeks and U.S. Secretary of Navy Edwin Denby watched the demonstration along with U.S. Army General John J. Pershing and other prominent U.S. officials in attendance. To the embarrassment of the planners, only 13 of the 52 bombs struck the Ostfriesland, and only four of those actually exploded, without sinking the German warship. The U.S. Army carried out a second attack the next day, as two 2,000 pounds (910 kg) bombs sank Ostfriesland 60 miles (97 km) off of the American coast.
- The British cabinet voted to approve Prime Minister David Lloyd George's peace proposal to the Irish Republicans, which included Dominion status and self-government for Ireland in all domestic matters, while reserving defense and foreign relations to the United Kingdom.
- Born: Ted Schroeder, American tennis player who won the finals at the U.S. Open in 1942 and at Wimbledon in 1949; as Frederick Rudolph Schroeder, in Newark, New Jersey(d. 2006)

== July 21, 1921 (Thursday) ==
- The Eskimo Pie was launched as a packaged chocolate and ice cream dessert when Christian Nelson of Onawa, Iowa, was able to persuade candy manufacturer Russell Stover to invest in what Nelson initially called "the I-Scream-Bar."
- After meeting with King George V, British Prime Minister David Lloyd George presented a peace proposal to Irish Republican Éamon de Valera, offering recognition of self-governing Dominion of Ireland in return for Irish permission for Britain to maintain a military and naval presence.
- As the Russian Civil War continued, the Soviet ship Sawa was shelled and sunk by the Soviet submarine Trotsky in the Black Sea while trying to defect to the Whites. The vessel and most of her crew were killed. Four men were rescued and imprisoned.
- Died: Milorad Drašković, 48, Serbian politician and Minister of Internal Affairs for Yugoslavia, the kingdom's police agency, was assassinated by a member of the Yugoslavian Communist Party. The killing, coupled with the June 29 attempt on the life of Prince Alexander, prompted the passage of the Law Concerning the Protection of Security and Order in the State eleven days later on August 1 (b. 1873)

== July 22, 1921 (Friday) ==
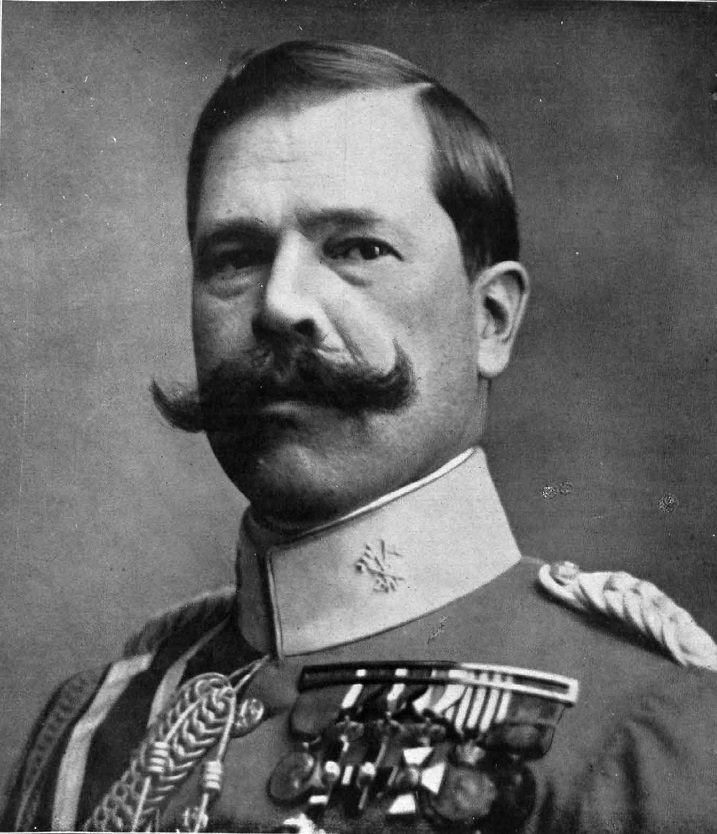
General Fernández Silvestre

- In the Battle of Annual in Morocco, during the Rif War, Spanish troops were defeated by Berber rebels under Abd el-Krim. King Alfonso XIII cut short his holiday in San Sebastián to return to Madrid. The defeat in North Africa forced the Spanish Army to flee the positions that they had captured at Melilla. The commander of the attack, Spain's General Manuel Fernández Silvestre and his staff of officers, surrounded by Moroccan troops and cut off from their own, committed suicide rather than allowing themselves to be taken prisoner. Of the 587 soldiers, officers and civilians taken prisoner, only 326 would still be alive 18 months later when the Republic of the Rif would release them on January 27, 1923, following the payment of a four million peseta ransom.
- The Douglas Aircraft Company, predecessor to McDonnell Douglas Corporation, was established by Donald W. Douglas in Santa Monica, California.
- The U.S. Open golf tournament was won by the UK's Jim Barnes.

== July 23, 1921 (Saturday) ==
- The Chinese Communist Party held its first national congress in Shanghai, with fifty members.
- Sun Yat-sen, having declared the "Extraordinary Government of China", announced that he would set up an autonomous government in Guangzhou (Canton) and Nanjing, and sever relations with the Peking (Beijing) government in northern China.
- U.S. President Harding and prominent business leaders Thomas Edison, Henry Ford, and Harvey Firestone went on a camping trip in the Blue Ridge Mountains in Virginia in order to privately discuss economic proposals.

== July 24, 1921 (Sunday) ==
- The Battle of Kütahya–Eskişehir between Greek and Turkish forces ended in a Turkish retreat.
- U.S. Secretary of Commerce Herbert Hoover informed the Soviet Union's Maxim Gorky that the American Relief Administration would provide famine aid, on the condition that the Soviets release American prisoners.
- Charles Sheeler and Paul Strand's documentary film, Manhatta, premièred at the Rialto Theatre in New York City, United States, under the title New York the Magnificent.
- Born: Giuseppe Di Stefano, Italian operatic tenor; in Motta Sant'Anastasia (d. 2008)

== July 25, 1921 (Monday) ==
- The Belgium–Luxembourg Economic Union, an antecedent of the European Economic Community and the European Union, was created by a treaty between the two Western European monarchies, signed at Brussels.
- U.S. boxer Pete Herman defeated Joe Lynch on points in a rematch for the world bantamweight title in a bout at Ebbets Field in New York City, reclaiming the title that he had lost to Lynch on December 26.

== July 26, 1921 (Tuesday) ==
- U.S. President Harding granted an official reception to impostor Stanley Clifford Weyman, who was posing as a representative of Princess Fatima Sultana, a daughter of Mohammad Yaqub Khan, the former Emir of Afghanistan. Nevertheless, the U.S. recognized Amanullah Khan as the Emir of Afghanistan and would establish diplomatic relations in 1935.
- Mexico's President Alvaro Obregon announced a reduction of 10 percent in wages for all government and military officials.
- Born: Amedeo Amadei, Italian footballer and manager; in Frascati (d. 2013)

== July 27, 1921 (Wednesday) ==
- Frederick Banting and his team at the University of Toronto announced their discovery of insulin.
- Japan agreed to participate in the Washington Conference on Disarmament, to be convened by U.S. President Harding on November 11.
- Born: George K. Fraenkel, American physical chemist who developed instruments to measure electron spin resonance; in Deal, New Jersey (d. 2009)

== July 28, 1921 (Thursday) ==
- The Church of Scotland Act 1921 received royal assent from King George V of the United Kingdom, giving the Presbyterian Church of Scotland complete independence in spiritual questions and appointments.
- In the U.S., Johns Hopkins University Hospital in Baltimore announced the first American policy for medical price limitations, with a maximum of $1,000 for a surgical operation and $35 per week for hospitalization. The prices were equivalent 100 years later to $15,100 for surgery and $530/week for hospitalization.

== July 29, 1921 (Friday) ==
- Adolf Hitler was elected as the new Chairman of Germany's Nazi Party by a 533 to 1 vote of the delegates, replacing party founder Anton Drexler.
- The Council on Foreign Relations, the nonprofit foreign relations think tank, was formally incorporated.
- Born: Richard Egan, U.S. actor; in San Francisco (died 1987)

== July 30, 1921 (Saturday) ==
- Police from the Shanghai French Concession closed down the 1st National Congress of the Chinese Communist Party. The 50 delegates agreed to move the meeting to a rented tourist boat on South Lake in Jiaxing.

== July 31, 1921 (Sunday) ==
- In Sarzana, Italy, a group of 500 Fascists occupied the railway station in an attempt to secure the release of Fascist prisoners, but was defeated by 12 Carabinieri and some local people. In the battle that followed, 18 people were killed.
- Born: Whitney Young Jr., African American civil rights leader and National Urban League Executive Director from 1961 until his death; at Lincoln Institute, near Simpsonville, Kentucky (d. 1971)
