= Subphrenic abscess =

Subphrenic Abscess
- Other names: Subdiaphragmatic Abscess
- Specialty: Infectious diseases, gastroenterology

Subphrenic abscess is a disease characterized by an accumulation of infected fluid between the diaphragm, liver, and spleen. This abscess develops after surgical operations like splenectomy. Presents with cough, increased respiratory rate with shallow respiration, diminished or absent breath sounds, hiccups, dullness in percussion, tenderness over the 8th–11th ribs, fever, chills, anorexia and shoulder tip pain on the affected side. Lack of treatment or misdiagnosis could quickly lead to sepsis, septic shock, and death. Patients who develop peritonitis may get localized abscesses in the right or left subphrenic space. The right side is more common due to the high frequency of ruptured appendices and perforated duodenal ulcers. Two common approaches to draining a subphrenic abscess are 1) incision inferior to or through the bed of the 12th rib (no need to create an opening in the pleura or peritoneum) 2) an anterior subphrenic abscess is often drained through a subcostal incision located inferior and parallel to the right costal margin. It is also associated with peritonitis.
