= Gertrudis de la Fuente =

Spanish biochemist

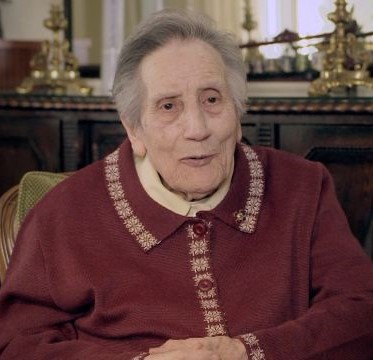
- Born: Gertrudis de la Fuente Sánchez; 21 August 1921; Madrid, Spain
- Died: 23 January 2017 (aged 95); Madrid, Spain
- Education: Complutense University of Madrid
- Scientific career
- Workplaces: Consejo Superior de Investigaciones Científicas

Gertrudis de la Fuente Sánchez (21 August 1921 – 23 January 2017) was a Spanish biochemist who specialised in enzymology. She was a professor in the Spanish National Research Council in Madrid. She coordinated the Spanish government's commission to protect against the 1981 toxic oil syndrome. Her life and scientific career was partially chronicled in the short film, Gertrudis (la mujer que no enterró sus talentos), which was released in 2016.

== Early life and education ==
Gertrudis de la Fuente Sánchez was born in Madrid, Spain on 21 August 1921, the daughter of a train driver. She moved to Arroyo de Malpartida, Cáceres aged six for her father's work. She grew up in a rural area, where girls were not usually educated beyond primary school, and did not start high school until her father retired. In 1935 she moved to Madrid, where she began to study for her baccalaureate, but was interrupted by the Spanish Civil War. She studied geometry, eventually graduating in 1942. She completed a bachelor's degree in chemistry at the Complutense University of Madrid in 1948. At university she also attended physics classes. She began her research career working for free in the pharmacy faculty with biochemist Santos Ruiz the only professor of biochemistry in Spain. In 1950 she secured a grant to write her doctoral thesis, which she defended in 1954.

== Career ==
In 1956, she was appointed as a collaborator in the Spanish National Research Council, was promoted to researcher in 1960, and to professor in 1962. In 1970 the Institute of Enzymology relocated to the Faculty of Medicine at the Universidad Autónoma de Madrid. In 1981 she was commissioned the Spanish government to coordinate an investigation into toxic oil syndrome.

=== Toxic Oil Syndrome ===
During the 1981 toxic oil syndrome there was a mass poisoning in Spain. Researchers identified that the poisoning was due to industrial rapeseed oil ending up in the market for humans. The syndrome lasted forty days and affected more than 20,000 people, leaving more than 1,100 dead. She was part of the Advisory Commission for Scientific and Technical Research (Comisión Asesora de Investigación Científica y Técnica).

== Death and legacy ==
She carried on teaching and supervising PhD students until her retirement. In 2015, a film was made about her life, education and work. She won the Club of 25 Award for her contributions to science. She died in 2017, and was remembered as being "active and serene" and "steadfast in equality – for women and in general" by María Jesús Santesmases.

== See also ==
- List of Spanish inventors and discoverers
