= SS City of Brunswick =

Coordinates: 44°26′49.6″N 63°31′45.7″W

History

United States
- Name: City of Brunswick
- Namesake: Brunswick
- Owner: USSB
- Operator: Page & Jones
- Ordered: 30 October 1917
- Builder: Oscar Daniels Shipbuilding Co., Tampa
- Cost: US$1,887,613.66
- Yard number: 10
- Laid down: 27 October 1919
- Launched: 17 February 1921
- Sponsored by: Mrs. S. L. High
- Completed: 31 May 1921
- Maiden voyage: 18 July 1921
- Home port: Tampa
- Identification: US Official Number 221007; Call sign MCJT
- Fate: Wrecked, 26 August 1921

General characteristics
- Type: Design 1027 Ship
- Tonnage: 7,225 GRT; 4,465 NRT; 9,493 DWT
- Length: 402 ft 1 in (122.56 m)
- Beam: 54 ft 0 in (16.46 m)
- Draft: 26 ft 10 1/2 in (8.192 m) (loaded)
- Depth: 34 ft 4 in (10.46 m)
- Installed power: 359 Nhp, 2,800 ihp
- Propulsion: Hardy Tyne Manufacturing Co. 3-cylinder triple expansion
- Speed: 11 knots (13 mph; 20 km/h)

City of Brunswick was a steam cargo ship built in 1921 by Oscar Daniels Shipbuilding Company of Tampa for the United States Shipping Board as part of the wartime shipbuilding program of the Emergency Fleet Corporation (EFC) to restore the nation's Merchant Marine. The freighter ran aground and was wrecked on her first commercial trip to Europe off Halifax in August 1921.

== Design and construction ==
After the United States entry into World War I, a large shipbuilding program was undertaken to restore and enhance shipping capabilities both of the United States and their Allies. As part of this program, EFC placed orders with nation's shipyards for a large number of vessels of standard designs. Design 1027 cargo ship was a standard cargo freighter of approximately 9,500 deadweight designed by Oscar Daniels and adopted by USSB.

City of Brunswick was the last of the order for 10 vessels placed by USSB with Oscar Daniels Shipbuilding Co. on 30 October 1917 and was laid down on 27 October 1919 and launched on 17 February 1921 (yard number 10), with Mrs. S. L. High of Brunswick, Georgia being the sponsor. The vessel was named in honor of town of Brunswick in Georgia whose residents finished first in their district in subscription for the fourth Liberty Loan. The ship was a two-deck three-island steamer built on the Isherwood principle of longitudinal framing, had six main holds and also possessed all the modern machinery for quick loading and unloading of cargo from five main hatches, including ten winches and a large number of derricks. The vessel had electric lights installed along the decks and was also equipped with wireless.

The dock tests were held on April 12 in the presence of Shipping Board officials and were successfully passed. The sea trials were conducted on April 27 in Tampa Bay and in the Gulf of Mexico. After their successful completion City of Brunswick returned to the shipyard to finalize construction and was handed over to the USSB at the end of May, and officially commissioned on May 31.

As built, the ship was 402 feet 1 inch (122.56 m) long (between perpendiculars) and 54 feet 0 inches (16.46 m) abeam, a depth of 34 feet 4 inches (10.46 m). City of Brunswick was originally assessed at 7,225 GRT and 4,465 NRT and had deadweight of approximately 9,493. The vessel had a steel hull with double bottom, and a single 359 nhp triple-expansion steam engine, with cylinders of 24 1/2-inch (62 cm), 41 1/2-inch (105 cm) and 72-inch (180 cm) diameter with a 48-inch (120 cm) stroke, that drove a single screw propeller, and moved the ship at up to 11 knots (13 mph; 20 km/h). The steam for the engine was supplied by three Foster Water Tube boilers fitted for oil fuel.

== Operational history ==
Following delivery to USSB the ship remained berthed in Tampa for two months before being handed over to Page & Jones of Mobile to operate on the Gulf Coast of the United States to Europe route. The vessel departed on her maiden voyage in ballast from Tampa to New Orleans for loading on July 18. After loading approximately 4,500 tons of wheat and flour the ship sailed from New Orleans for Mobile on 28 July 1921. In Mobile the freighter took on board nearly 1,500,000 feet of pine lumber and 80 bales of cotton and cleared from the port on August 9. The vessel, however, developed problem with her machinery and had to return for repairs, finally departing for Antwerp on August 15.

=== Sinking ===
City of Brunswick was proceeding on her first trip to Europe when on 25 August 1921 she suddenly started experiencing problems with one of her boilers. As the ship was close to Canadian coast, captain Rossi decided to call in at Halifax for repairs. Soon after midnight the ship ran full speed aground on The Sisters, the outermost of the eastern Sambro ledges, lying approximately two miles away from the Sambro Island Light. As the ship went aground, she injured her bottom and came to stop with the bulk of the ledge rocks being roughly amidships. The vessel started taking on water right away but her position was in no way dangerous. After examining the situation and being unable to dislodge the ship from the rocks, a distress signal was sent out and picked up by the wireless station in Halifax as well as tanker SS Montrolite. The tanker arrived in about an hour, and several tugs that were dispatched from Halifax, arrived at the scene by about 02:00 on August 26. After waiting for daybreak several attempts were made to move the freighter from her current position, but all of them proved to be unsuccessful. The crew abandoned the ship in early afternoon of August 26 after the ship started settling with large portion of the hull already being submerged. As the crew abandoned the ship a significant amount of looting by the locals took place before the authority could step in and put a stop to it. After examining the wreck on August 27, the owners declared City of Brunswick total loss. On September 24 the ship broke into two and sank with only the masts protruding from the water. On 14 February 1922 the wreck and the cargo were sold to William McFatridge of Halifax for US$2,000.
