= November 1921 =

Month of 1921

<<	November 1921					>>
Su	Mo	Tu	We	Th	Fr	Sa
		1	2	3	4	5
6	7	8	9	10	11	12
13	14	15	16	17	18	19
20	21	22	23	24	25	26
27	28	29	30

November 12, 1921: World arms limitation conference opens in Washington, DC

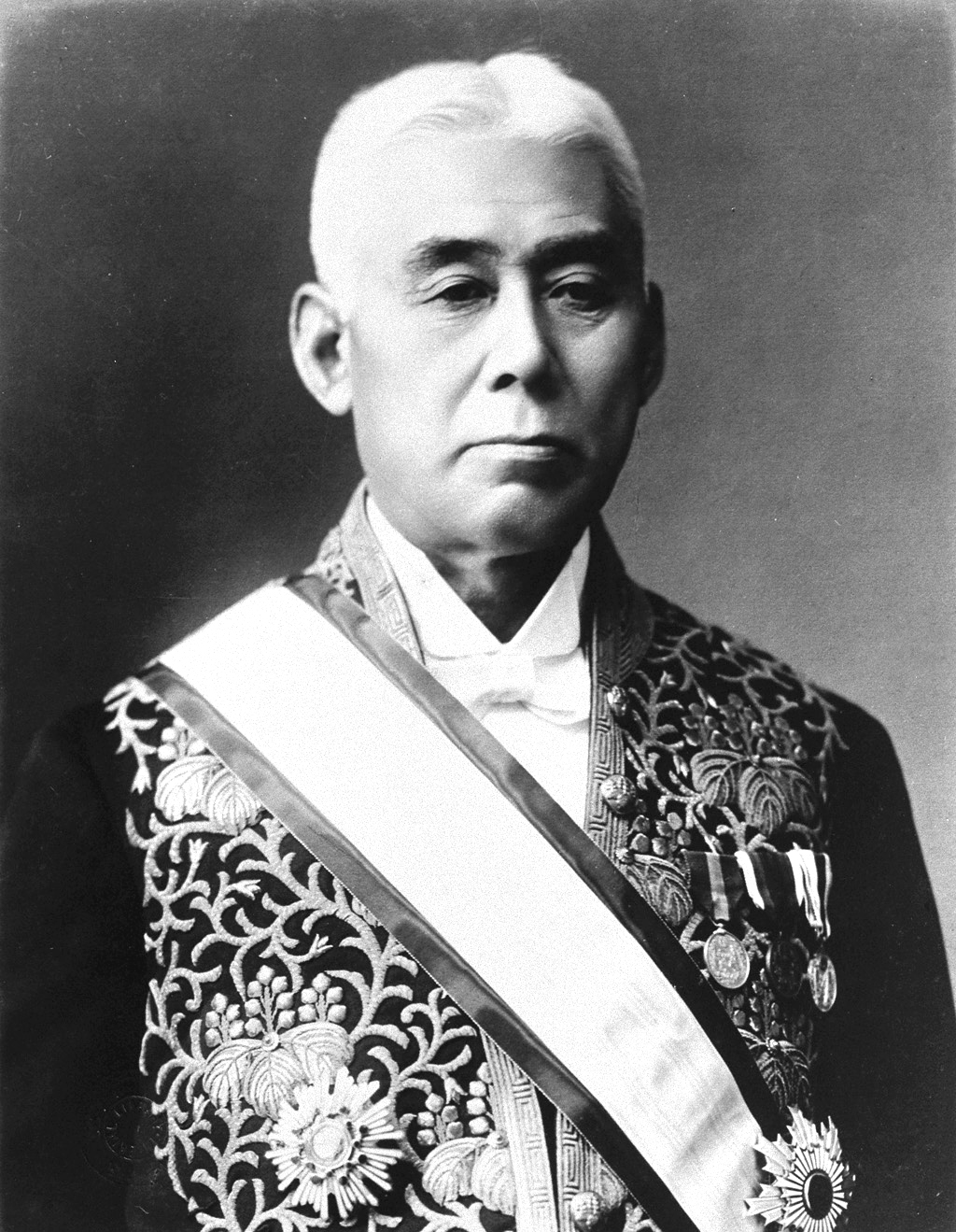
November 4, 1921: Japanese Prime Minister Hara Takashi assassinated at train station

The following events occurred in November 1921:

== November 1, 1921 (Tuesday) ==
- Averil Deverell and Frances Kyle became the first two women to be admitted to the practice of law in the United Kingdom.
- After U.S. Senator Thomas E. Watson of Georgia said in a speech that American soldiers had been hanged in France without proper trial, the Senate ordered the appointment of a special subcommittee to investigate.
- The U.S. State Department notified the Republic of China of a default on payment on a loan of $5.5 million.
- Groundbreaking for the Liberty Memorial in Kansas City, Missouri, was held in conjunction with the national convention of the American Legion, and was attended by commanders of the Allied nations, including then-Vice President Calvin Coolidge, Lieutenant General Baron Jacques of Belgium, Admiral of the Fleet Lord Beatty of Great Britain, General Armando Diaz of Italy, Marshal Ferdinand Foch of France, and General of the Armies John J. Pershing of the United States. The monument would be completed and dedicated five years later, on November 11, 1926.
- A storm off the coast of Cape May, New Jersey, killed 11 fishermen who had been at sea to take up their fishing nets for the winter.

== November 2, 1921 (Wednesday) ==
- The Emirate of Jabal Shammar, whose territory included most of the northern part of modern Saudi Arabia including the city of Ha'il, was conquered by the armies of the Sultanate of Nejd, led by Abdulaziz bin Abdul al-Saud, who united the Saudi kingdom under his control.
- The Swedish cargo ship Bellgrove foundered in the North Sea off Denmark near Lønstrup, killing 15 of the 19 crew.
- The British government asked the Soviet government in Moscow to be specific regarding payment of which pre-war debts of the Russian Empire would be paid back to the United Kingdom for loans during World War One.
- Born: Søren Kam, Danish-born member of the German SS who eluded prosecution for the murder of Danish newspaper editor Carl Henrik Clemmensen; in Copenhagen (d. 2015).

== November 3, 1921 (Thursday) ==
- Curtiss test pilot Bert Acosta won the Pulitzer Trophy in a Curtiss CR-2, establishing a new closed-circuit air speed record of 284.36 km/h (176.7 mph).
- A fire heavily damaged the docks and railroad yards of Weehawken, New Jersey.
- Born: Charles Bronson, American film actor, in Ehrenfeld, Pennsylvania (d. 2003)

== November 4, 1921 (Friday) ==
- The Prime Minister of Japan since 1918, Hara Takashi was stabbed to death by railwayman Nakaoka Kon'ichi at the Tokyo railway station while preparing to take a train to Kyoto for a conference of the Rikken Seiyūkai political party.
- Italy's Unknown Soldier of World War One was buried with ceremony at the Victor Emmanuel monument in Rome.
- The All-India Congress Committee of 200 voted in favor of continuing its support of the Mahatma Gandhi's passive resistance movement against the colonial government of British India.
- Yugoslavia's King Alexander returned to Belgrade after a long illness in Paris and formally assumed the throne.
- The Hungarian National Assembly passed a bill barring the Hapsburg family permanently from ruling Hungary, and deported former King Karoly VI of Hungary and Queen Zita to exile in Madeira, following a direct request from the Allied Powers.
- The value of Germany's Deutsche Mark dropped to an all-time low of almost 1/4 of a U.S. penny, with one dollar being the equivalent of 243 Marks.
- The French cargo ship Député Gaston Dumesnil left Penarth, Glamorgan, United Kingdom for Rouen, Seine-Inférieure, but foundered in the Bristol Channel. The bodies of six of the crew were later washed up on the north coast of Cornwall.
- Died: Oscar Montelius, 78, Swedish archaeologist.

== November 5, 1921 (Saturday) ==
- The most powerful wireless radio broadcast transmitter array, up to that time, opened on Long Island at Rocky Point, New York. With 12 high powered transmitters, the station was capable of broadcasting signals almost halfway around the world to Asia, and was six times more powerful than the Arlington Station in Virginia.
- The late King Ludwig III of Bavaria was allowed a funeral in Munich with full honors in the German Republic, despite concerns that the occasion would be used as an excuse by monarchists to call for the restoration of the House of Wittelsbach to rule of the German state. Instead, former Bavarian Crown Prince Rupprecht avoided any call at the funeral for a restoration of the monarchy.
- The forward pass was tested in Canadian football in an exhibition game in Montreal between McGill University and visiting Syracuse University.
- Born: Princess Fawzia Fuad of Egypt, daughter of King Fuad I of Egypt, and Queen of Iran (as the first wife of the Shah of Iran (from his ascension to the throne in 1941 until their divorce in 1948); at Ras el-Tin Palace, Alexandria (d. 2013).
- Died: Reverend Antoinette Brown Blackwell, 96, the first woman to be ordained a minister in the United States.

== November 6, 1921 (Sunday) ==
- The parliament of Hungary voted to void any claims that former King Karoly IV or any other member of the House of Habsburg had to the Hungarian throne. The vote repealed the 208 year old Pragmatic Sanction of 1713 that had allowed the Habsburgs the right to rule Hungary.
- As inflation spiraled out of control in Germany, the Allied Reparations Commission announced its intention to go to Berlin to determine the prospects of Germany making its next reparations payment of $120,000,000 on the due date of January 15.
- In Rome, Pope Benedict XV appointed a young priest, Angelo Giuseppe Roncalli, as the president of Italy's branch of the Society for the Propagation of the Faith. Roncalli would continue to receive appointments to higher positions within the Roman Catholic Church, becoming a Cardinal in 1953, and would be elected as Pope John XXIII in 1958.
- Born: James Jones, American writer, in Robinson, Illinois (d. 1977).

== November 7, 1921 (Monday) ==
- Eusebio Ayala became the new President of Paraguay after being appointed by the National Congress to fill the vacancy caused by the resignation of Manuel Gondra and the unsuccessful efforts of Vice President Félix Paiva to be accepted as Gondra's successor. Ayala served for almost 18 months, resigning on April 12, 1923.
- At Prague, representatives of the governments of Poland and Czechoslovakia signed a treaty providing cooperation on common matters and a pledge to not interfere in each other's policies.
- The Norwegian cargo ship Alf foundered in the North Sea, killing 16 of the 18 crew off of the coast of England near Lowestoft, Suffolk.

== November 8, 1921 (Tuesday) ==
- Serb forces from Yugoslavia invaded Albania, leading to the United Kingdom's protest in the League of Nations.
- The state of war that had existed since December 7, 1917, between the United States and the Empire of Austria, ended with the ratification of the U.S.–Austrian Peace Treaty.
- The Washington Daily News was launched in Washington, D.C. as an afternoon tabloid, becoming the national capital's fifth daily newspaper. Preferred by the African-American community in Washington, the Daily News existed for more than 50 years, before being purchased in 1972 by the older Washington Star and shut down on July 12.
- Born:
  - Gene Saks, American actor and film director, in New York City (d. 2015).
  - John Henry Sharpe, Premier of Bermuda from 1975 to 1977; in St. George's, Bermuda (d. 1999)

== November 9, 1921 (Wednesday) ==
- The day after an unprecedented robbery of two million dollars from the main post office in New York City, the U.S. Department of the Post Office suspended three of the officials of the office, and requested the United States Marines to supply guards on mail trucks and railroad cars.
- Italy's National Fascist Party (Partito Nazionale Fascista or PNF) was founded at a convention of Fascist Italians in Rome. In protest over the Fascist agenda, a one-day general strike was called by labor unions within the Italian capital.
- Britain's Chancellor of the Exchequer, Sir Robert Horne, announced to the House of Commons that the United Kingdom would pay 50 million pounds sterling to the United States in 1922, representing the interest incurred on U.S. loans during 1921.
- Seven of the 18 crew on the Colombian cargo ship Mensabe died when the ship sank during a voyage from Panama City to Buenaventura.

== November 10, 1921 (Thursday) ==
- The British House of Commons was prorogued until January.
- Died: Dr. Jennie Kidd Trout, 80, the first woman in Canada to become a licensed M.D.

== November 11, 1921 (Friday) ==
- During an Armistice Day ceremony at Arlington National Cemetery in Virginia, United States, the Tomb of the Unknown Soldier was dedicated by President Warren G. Harding.
- Using telephone lines that would later be part of a transcontinental radio broadcasting network, AT&T transmitted the Armistice Day speech of President Harding to auditoriums in New York City and San Francisco.
- The UK's first official "Poppy Day" took place on Remembrance Day; poppies were sold by the Royal British Legion at the instigation of Madame Guérin.
- On the third anniversary of the end of the First World War, the United States and Germany exchanged their formal ratifications of the 1921 peace treaty.
- Deruluft (abbreviation for Deutsch Russische Luftverkehrs, or German-Russian Airlines, a joint venture of Germany and the Soviet Union, was founded. The company began operations on May 1, 1922, with a flight between Moscow and the then-German city of Königsberg (now Kaliningrad) in Russia, and would operate until March 31, 1937, with a dissolution following a split between Hitler of Germany and Stalin of the USSR.
- Born: Terrel Bell, the second U.S. Secretary of Education; in Lava Hot Springs, Idaho (d. 1996).
- Died: John Augustine Zahm, 70, American Roman Catholic minister and South American explorer.

== November 12, 1921 (Saturday) ==
- The Washington Disarmament Conference, hosted by U.S. President Warren G. Harding. opened in Washington, D.C. and was attended by representatives of the U.S., the UK, France, Italy, Japan and China, with the objective of halting the arms race with an agreement among the world's superpowers to reduce the number of ships in their navies, although other matters were discussed at the same proceeding besides naval.
- General Jorge Holguín became the new President of Colombia after the resignation of President Marco Fidel Suárez.
- Nicaraguan troops defeated anti-government rebels who had attacked the town of Somotillo, near the Nicaraguan borders with Honduras and El Salvador.
- Badische Beamten-Genossenschaftsbank, one of the largest cooperative banks (or credit unions) in Germany and now known as "BBBank", was founded in Karlsruhe by postal inspector Gotthold Mayer as means for government employees to save and borrow money.
- Died: Fernand Khnopff, 63, Belgian symbolist painter.

== November 13, 1921 (Sunday) ==
- The first ship specifically designed to be an aircraft carrier, the Imperial Japanese Navy carrier Hōshō, was launched from the Asano Shipyard in Yokohama. With a slightly downward sloping flight deck 552 feet (168 m) long and 74.25 feet (22.63 m) wide, the ship would be commissioned on December 27, 1922.
- Baron Takahashi Korekiyo was installed as the new Prime Minister of Japan to succeed the late Takashi Hara, who had been assassinated on November 4. Baron Korekiyo continued to serve as Minister of Finance and Minister of the Navy, and made no changes in Hara's existing cabinet.
- Birth control advocate Margaret Sanger was arrested by New York police while speaking about contraception to an audience of women and men at the city's forum for lectures, The Town Hall.

== November 14, 1921 (Monday) ==
- The Communist Party of Spain (Partido Comunista de España or PCE) was established by a merger of the Spanish Communist Party and the Spanish Communist Workers' Party.
- An anti-Catholic vandal inside the Basilica of Our Lady of Guadalupe in Mexico City attempted to destroy the nearly 400-year old image of the Blessed Virgin Mary that had formed on the cloak of Juan Diego Cuauhtlatoatzin in 1531. Although the vandal used a bomb powerful enough to damage the altar upon which the image was placed, and items around it, the image and the cloak were unharmed, an event cited as a miracle by devotees of Our Lady of Guadalupe.
- The International Ladies Garment Workers Union went on strike in New York to stop the resumption of the piece-work system of payment.
- U.S. President Harding signed a proclamation declaring that the war with Germany, started on April 6, 1917, had ended effective July 2, 1921.
- Born: Brian Keith (Robert Alba Keith), American stage, film and television actor; in Bayonne, New Jersey (committed suicide, 1997).
- Died: Isabel, Princess Imperial of Brazil, 75, daughter of Emperor Pedro II of Brazil, heiress presumptive during his reign and regent acting on his behalf during his absences from the country prior to his being deposed in 1889. After his death in 1891, she became the head of the House of Braganza. Her son, Pedro de Alcântara, Prince of Grão-Pará, renounced any claims to the throne in 1908. Her grandson, Pedro Henrique Orléans-Braganza assumed the role of leading the Braganzas.

== November 15, 1921 (Tuesday) ==
- Radio broadcasting began in the U.S. city of Chicago as Westinghouse Electric and Commonwealth Edison jointly launched station KYW.
- At the Washington Disarmament Conference, delegates from the UK, France, Italy and Japan approved in principle of the proposals by U.S. Secretary of State Hughes for the U.S. Navy, Britain's Royal Navy and the Japanese Imperial Navy to cut their fleets by a total of 66 ships.
- U.S. President Harding welcomed Mirza Hussein Khan Ali, Persia's first diplomatic emissary to the U.S.
- Chicago newspaper reporter Antoinette Van Hoesen Wakeman was fatally injured after being struck by a car during a visit to New York City. She lived for more than three weeks before dying of her injuries on December 8.
- Born:
  - Frank Rosenfelt, American film executive and onetime CEO of the MGM studio; in New York City (d. 2007).
  - Gu Yuezhen, Chinese opera singer who led her own opera troupe until her career was ended in the Cultural Revolution (committed suicide, 1970).
- Died: Tadhg Barry, 31, Irish Republican imprisoned at Ballykinlar, was shot by a prison guard while conversing with other prisoners who were being released.

== November 16, 1921 (Wednesday) ==
- In Washington, Japan's Admiral Katō Tomosaburō made a counter-proposal to the Hughes plan for Japan's navy to be 60% as large as those of the U.S. and Britain, described as the 5:5:3 naval ratio, and sought a 70% ratio of 10:10:7.
- China's delegate to the conference, Dr. Sze, proposed a 10-point plan for the world's superpowers to maintain the territorial integrity of China, Manchuria and Mongolia in return for an "open door" policy on trade.
- At Pandikkad in British India, now in the Kerala state in India, Nepalese Gurkha troops repelled an attack by Muslim rebels during the Malabar rebellion.
- The executives of railway lines in the U.S. announced a 10 percent reduction of their rates for shipping agricultural products, to take effect on November 26.
- Born:
  - Laurence Levy, pioneering British neurosurgeon who practiced for most of his career in Africa; in London (d. 2007).
  - Paul Beeson, British cinematographer; in Hammersmith, London (d. 2001).

== November 17, 1921 (Thursday) ==
- The first radio broadcast in New Zealand was made by Professor Robert Jack from the Physics Department building of the University of Otago.
- Edward, Prince of Wales, heir to the British throne, was welcomed in Bombay (now Mumbai) as he arrived in British India.

== November 18, 1921 (Friday) ==
- Gosbank, the new state bank of the Soviet Union, began operations, opening in Moscow.
- In light of the discussions at the Washington Disarmament Conference, the British Admiralty ordered the suspension of new warship construction until further notice.
- The U.S. Senate overwhelmingly approved the Willis–Campbell Act to prohibit the prescription of beer for medicinal purposes. Physicians were still allowed to prescribe one-half of a pint (236 ml) of whiskey and wine to patients, and limited to a book of 100 prescriptions every 90 days. The measure passed, 56 to 22, with 11 Republicans and 10 Democrats opposing, and was signed by President Harding five days later.
- After a financial panic in China caused a run on the banks, General Wu Peifu assured diplomats that he would guarantee payment of China's foreign loans if the government in Beijing fell.
- The Representatives of Yugoslavia and Albania appeared before the Council of the League of Nations in Paris and pledged to respect the tentative boundary line that had been laid down between the two nations by the Council of Ambassadors.
- American sailor and photographer Harry Pidgeon began an attempt to become the second person (after the late Joshua Slocum) to sail around the world by himself, departing on a sailboat he had built himself, the Islander, from Los Angeles. He would take almost four years to complete the circumnavigation, returning to L.A. on October 31, 1925.

== November 19, 1921 (Saturday) ==
- Flying the same Curtiss CR-2 involved in his record-breaking flight of November 3, Bert Acosta sets a new world speed record of 197.8 miles per hour (318.3 km/h).
- The Sheppard–Towner Act, the first legislation to provide for federal welfare payments, was approved by the U.S. House of Representatives, 279 to 139, to provide federal funding for prenatal care and child care. President Harding signed it into law on November 23.
- The National Library of Mongolia was established in Ulaanbaatar with an initial donation of only 200 books.
- Brought by the Royal Navy cruiser HMS Cardiff, former Austro-Hungarian Emperor Charles and Empress Zita arrived at the Portuguese island of Madeira for their exile after Charles had attempted to take the throne of Hungary.
- Born: Roy Campanella, African-American baseball player in the Negro National League for the Baltimore Elite Giants, and in the National League for the Brooklyn Dodgers; inductee into the National Baseball Hall of Fame; in Philadelphia (d. 1993).

== November 20, 1921 (Sunday) ==
- Sixty-four Mappila Muslim prisoners captured in battle by the British Army in India, and three Hindus, died after being herded into a closed railway car for transportation to a prison camp. In all, 122 people were forced into a single boxcar, and more than half of them suffocated.
- Elections were held in Belgium for the 186 seats in the Chamber of Representatives and the 93 seats in the Belgian Senate. In the lower house, the Catholic Party, led by Georges Theunis won 70 seats and formed a coalition with the 33 seats of the Liberal Party. Theunis replaced Henri Carton de Wiart.
- Amable Jones, the Governor of Argentina's San Juan Province since 1919, was assassinated.
- Born: Charles Kleibacker, American fashion designer, in Cullman, Alabama (d. 2010).

== November 21, 1921 (Monday) ==
- Canada was granted its own armorial bearings by Royal Proclamation of King George V of the United Kingdom. Red and white were adopted as the country's official colours.

== November 22, 1921 (Tuesday) ==
- A treaty between the United Kingdom and Afghanistan was signed at Kabul, giving written assurances that no Russian consulates would be permitted in the areas adjoining the Indian frontier. The new treaty amended the 1919 Treaty of Rawalpindi, reaffirmed Britain's recognition of Afghanistan's independence, restored the privilege of importing munitions through India, and transferred a small area near the Khyber Pass to Afghanistan.
- Japan tentatively agreed to recognize Manchuria as an integral part of China, after originally arguing that Chinese territory should be limited to what was within the protection of the Great Wall of China.
- Twenty people were killed in Belfast as the truce between Irish nationalists and Northern Ireland Unionists was broken.
- The British royal family announced the engagement of Princess Mary, the only daughter of King George V, to Viscount Lascelles, son of the Earl Of Harewood.
- Born:
  - Rodney Dangerfield (stage name for Jack Roy, formerly Jacob Rodney Cohen), American comedian and film actor known for his self-deprecating humor; on Long Island in Babylon, New York (d. 2004).
  - Alfred Atherton, American diplomat and U.S. Ambassador to Egypt; in Pittsburgh (d. 2002).
- Died:
  - Christina Nilsson, 78, Swedish operatic soprano.
  - Edward J. Adams, 34, American armed robber and murderer, was killed in a shootout with police in Wichita, Kansas, two days after he had killed a Wichita patrol officer.

== November 23, 1921 (Wednesday) ==
- The Sheppard–Towner Act was signed by U.S. President Warren G. Harding, providing federal funding for maternity and child care.
- At the Ukraine village of Bazar, 359 Ukrainian Army soldiers were executed by firing squad after surrendering to the Soviet Red Army following their defeat in battle and their refusal to defect to the Red Army. Those killed were part of 443 under the command of Yuriy Tyutyunnyk who had recruited from Volhynia.
- Born:
  - Suratha (pen name for T. Rasagopalan), Tamil language Indian poet known for his use of similes; in Tanjore, British India (now Thanjavur, Tamil Nadu state) (d. 2006).
  - Günther Scheel, German fighter ace with 70 kills as a Luftwaffe pilot on the Russian front in World War II; in Dannenberg, Saxony (killed in combat, 1943)
  - Ferdinando "Fred" Buscaglione, Italian-born American character actor in film and singer; in Turin (killed in auto accident, 1960).

== November 24, 1921 (Thursday) ==
- The asteroid Petunia, measuring 17 miles (27 km) in diameter, was discovered by German astronomer Karl Reinmuth using a telescope at the Heidelberg Observatory, who gave it a name making it one of the few minor planets to be named for a flower.
- Died: Ernest Wadsworth Longfellow, 76, landscape artist and the son of poet Henry Wadsworth Longfellow.

== November 25, 1921 (Friday) ==
- Crown Prince Hirohito was made regent of Japan in place of his ailing father, Emperor Yoshihito.
- Prime Minister David Lloyd George of the United Kingdom of Great Britain and Ireland called off further discussion of peaceful settlement in the Irish crisis, informing the Northern Ireland Premier, James Craig, that Sinn Féin's members would refuse to take an oath of allegiance to the King as a condition of serving in an All-Ireland parliament.
- The gradual withdrawal of U.S. Army troops from occupation of Germany began as 600 troops departed on a train from Coblenz, going to Belgium to board a ship back to the United States.
- Born: J. J. Ebers, American electrical engineer who constructed, with John L. Moll, the mathematical theory for the Ebers—Moll model of the bipolar junction transistor; in Grand Rapids, Michigan (d. 1959).
- Died: Frank Dunklee Currier, 68, U.S. Representative for New Hampshire, 1901 to 1913, author of the U.S. copyright law

== November 26, 1921 (Saturday) ==
- U.S. Army Lieutenant Colonel Charles White Whittlesey, who had received the Medal of Honor for his leadership of the "Lost Battalion" in the Meuse-Argonne Offensive during World War I, was never seen again after he jumped from the British ocean liner SS Toloa on the same day the ship had departed from New York on a trip to Havana. Whittlesey left behind a will and instructions to the captain of the ship on the disposition of his luggage and personal effects.
- Born: František Listopad (pen name for Jiří Synek), Czech-born poet who later became a theatre and television director in Portugal; in Prague (d. 2017).
- Died: Sarah Robinson, 87, British temperance activist and champion of aid to veterans.

== November 27, 1921 (Sunday) ==
- Marshal Foch, commander of the Army of France during World War One, met with Sioux Indian leaders during a visit to Bismarck, North Dakota, smoked a peace pipe in a ceremony, and was given the honorary name of Watapech Wakiga ("Charging Thunder").
- The first Emperor's Cup, the national soccer football championship of Japan, was won by Tokyo Shukyu-Dan with a 1 to 0 victory over the Mikage Kicking-Team of Kobe in the final at the Hibiya Park field in Chiyoda City. The only goal was scored on a header by Andō of Tokyo from a corner kick by Sugaya.
- Born: Alexander Dubček, Slovak politician who became First Secretary of the Communist Party of Czechoslovakia in 1968 and instituted the democratic reforms of the "Prague Spring" before being deposed; in Uhrovec, Czechoslovakia (now in Slovakia) (d. 1992)

== November 28, 1921 (Monday) ==
- At the Disarmament Conference, the leading powers agreed with the request from China that the other nations shut down their system of "alien post offices" that had been maintained in China, in that China had built its own mail delivery service with over 13,000 locations. At the time, Japan had 124 post offices there, while France had 13, Britain had 12 and the U.S. had one. The Conference nations agreed, pledging to remove their offices by January 1, 1923.
- Died: ʻAbdu'l-Bahá, 77, Persian-born religious leader of the Baháʼí Faith.

== November 29, 1921 (Tuesday) ==
- Sir George Foster Pearce, Australia's Minister for Defence, addressed a luncheon at India House, a private club in New York City for persons involved in foreign commerce, and said that Australia was "the only continent peopled by one race" (notwithstanding its minority of Aboriginal Australians) and that it, like the United States and the United Kingdom, must forever remain "a white man's country". "There are some advantages of isolation," Pearce told his audience. "The United States has not only attracted many enterprising immigrants, but, you will admit, some who make neither for greatness nor safety. So far, Australia has attracted only the cream of the people of Europe."
- Died: Ivan Caryll (professional name for Felix Tilkins), 58, Belgian music composer of who specialized in the melodies for musical comedies, died eight days after he had suffered a hemorrhage while watching the rehearsal of his latest musical, Little Miss Raffles. Five of Caryll's songs were later used when the musical was renamed The Hotel Mouse.

== November 30, 1921 (Wednesday) ==
- French serial killer Henri Landru, was convicted in the Assizes Court in Versailles of the murder of ten women and a boy, and sentenced to execution by the guillotine. Landru would be beheaded three months later, on February 25, 1922.
- Died: Baron Mount Stephen, 92, Scottish-born Canadian railway entrepreneur who founded the Canadian Pacific Railway.
