= December 1921 =

Month of 1921

<<	December 1921					>>
Su	Mo	Tu	We	Th	Fr	Sa
				1	2	3
4	5	6	7	8	9	10
11	12	13	14	15	16	17
18	19	20	21	22	23	24
25	26	27	28	29	30	31

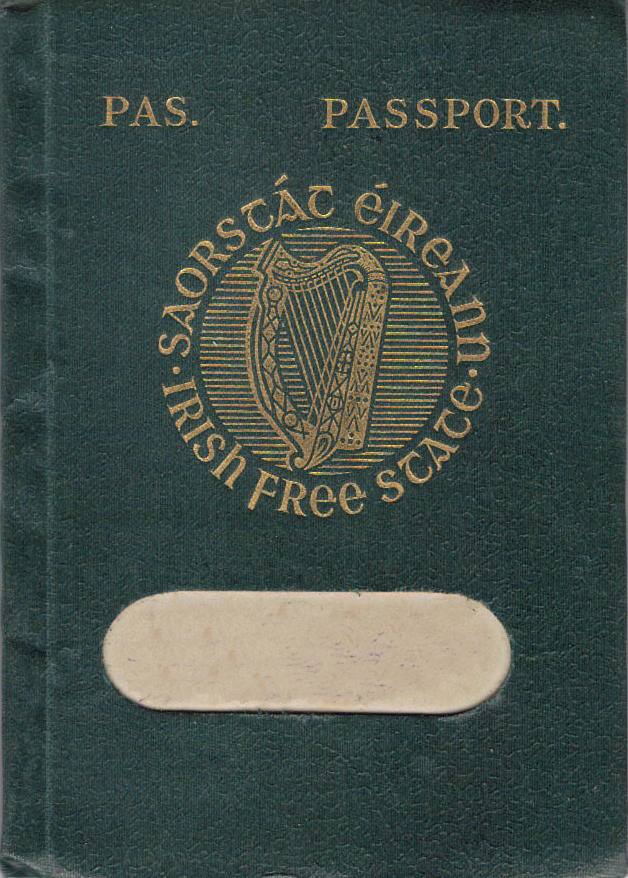
December 6, 1921: United Kingdom signs treaty recognizing independence of "Irish Free State"

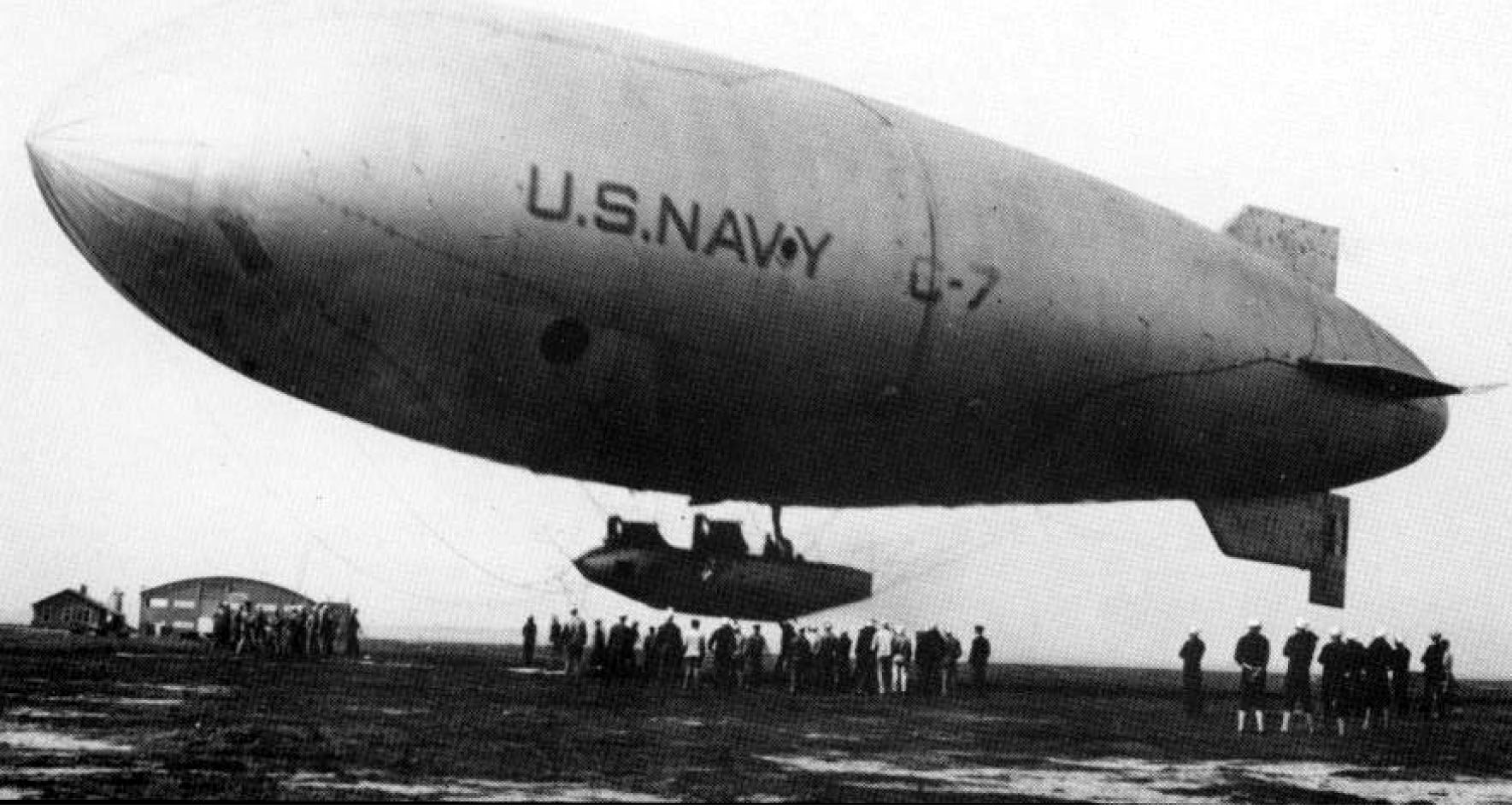
December 1, 1921: U.S. Navy airship C-7 demonstrates successful flight with helium rather than flammable hydrogen

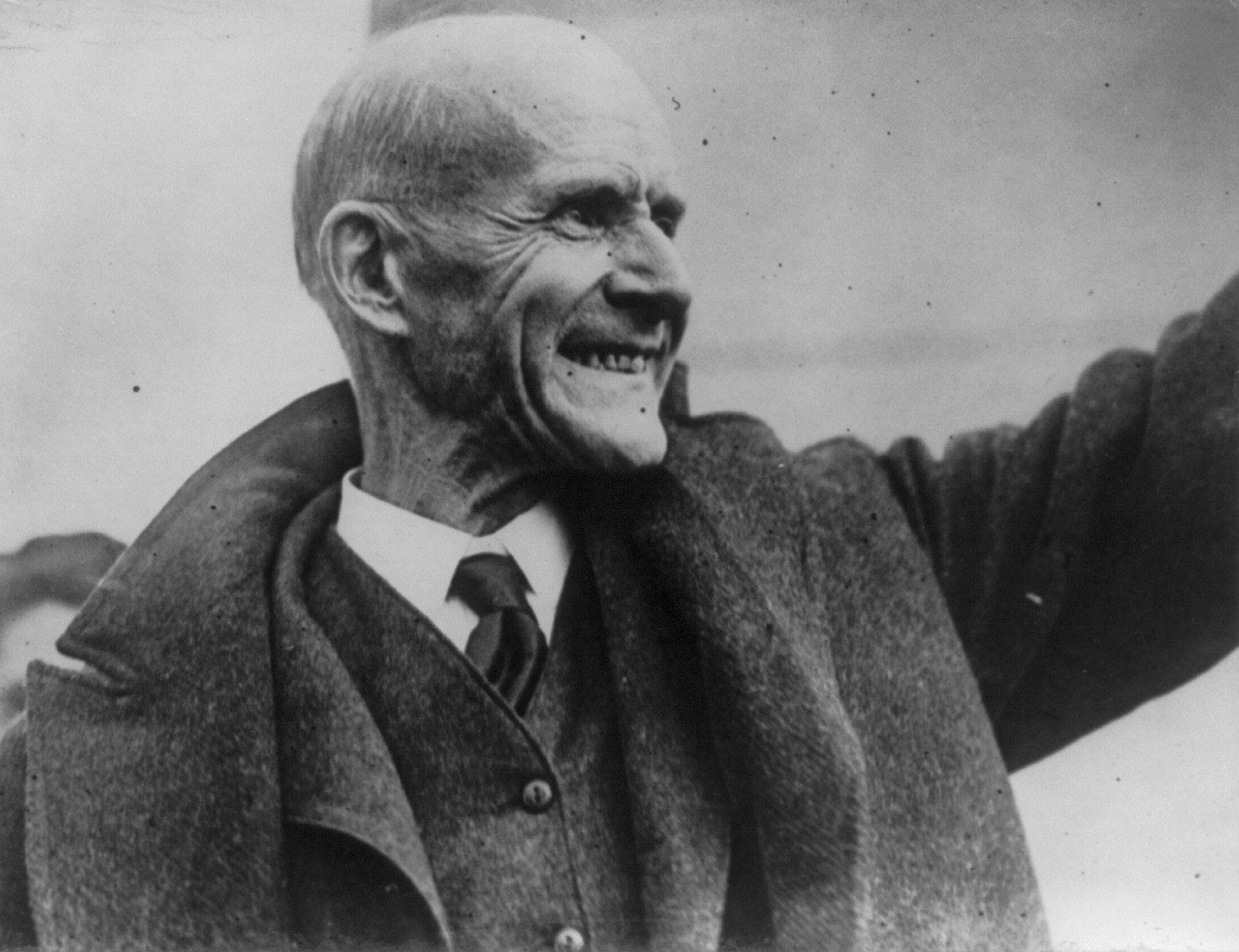
December 25, 1921: Sedition sentences, of Socialist Eugene V. Debs and 23 others, commuted by President Harding for release from prison

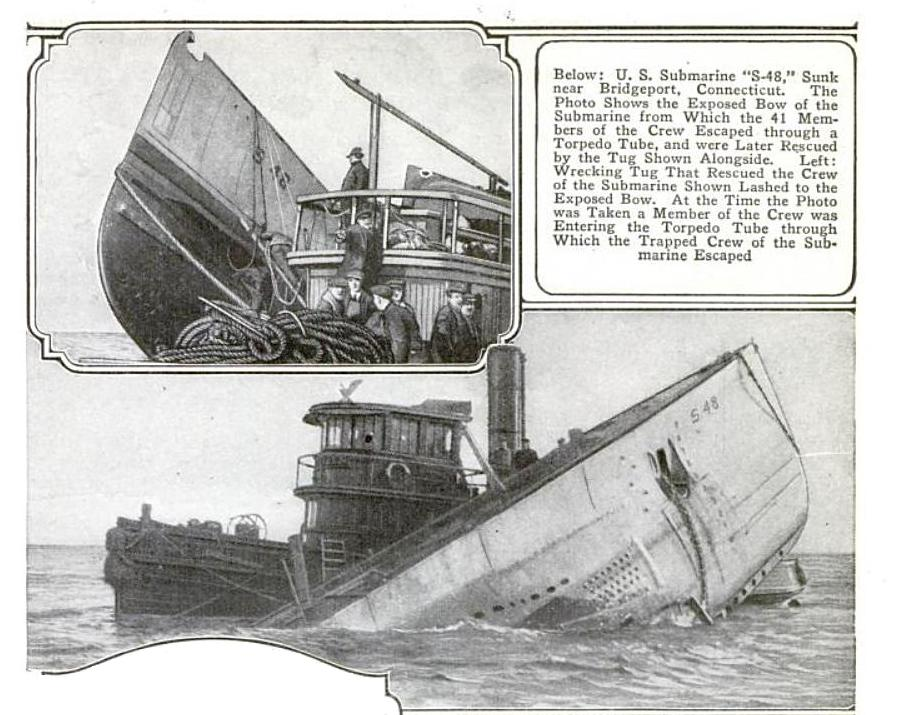
December 9, 1921: All 43 crew of U.S. Navy submarine S-48 rescued after sinking

The following events occurred in December 1921:

== December 1, 1921 (Thursday) ==
- The United States government implemented regulations for the right to broadcast wireless radio signals commercially, requiring a license from the U.S. Department of Commerce, Bureau of Navigation, for all transmitters and setting aside two specific frequencies on the amplitude modulation (AM) portion of the electromagnetic spectrum. Initially, stations broadcasting news reports were allowed the 485 meter wavelength (equivalent to 620 kHz) and those broadcasting entertainment were allowed 360 meters (roughly 830 kHz).
- For the first time, a manned airship was flown filled with non-flammable helium rather than hydrogen, as the United States Navy flew the C-7, a C-class blimp from Hampton Roads, Virginia to Washington, D.C. and back. C-7 was powered by two engines and had a gondola hanging from it that was large enough to carry a crew of four people.
- British Prime Minister David Lloyd George announced, for the first time in negotiations, that dominion status within the British Commonwealth would be offered to Ireland, similar to that existing at the time in Canada, as an alternative to independence. In addition, the six counties of Ulster Province would remain as Northern Ireland within the United Kingdom, and a boundary commission would be created to arrange a permanent definition of the boundary between north and south.
- Riots broke out in Vienna as a result of price increases. Shops were looted and foreign hotel guests were robbed.
- Nicaragua ended martial law in its northwestern provinces after receiving a shipment of weapons and munitions from the U.S.

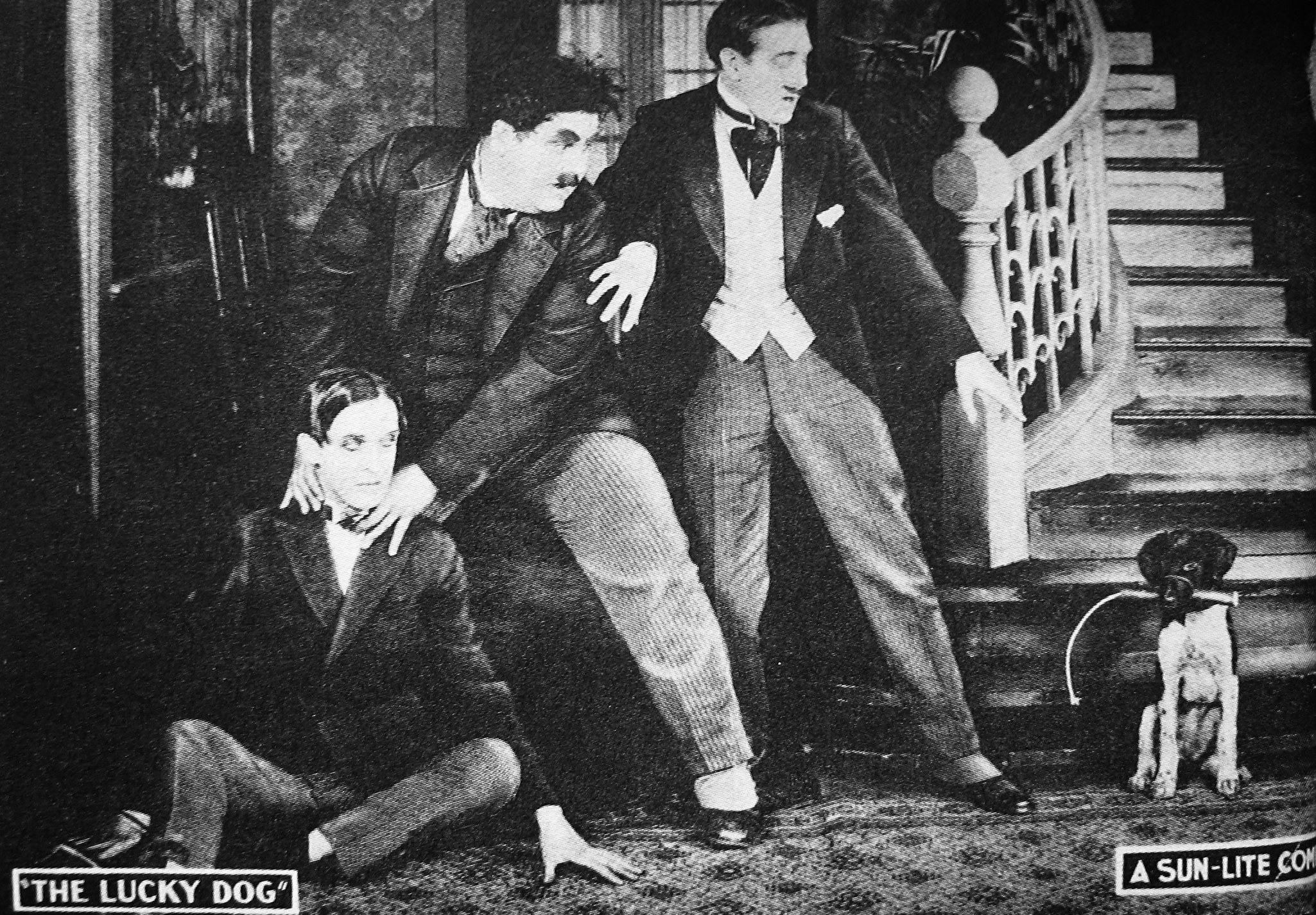
Stan Laurel (seated) and Oliver Hardy in The Lucky Dog

- The short (24 minutes) silent comedy film The Lucky Dog, starring Stan Laurel, was released by the Amalgamated Producing Company. Wearing a full mustache, another comedian, Oliver Hardy, had a role in the film as an armed robber confronting Laurel.

== December 2, 1921 (Friday) ==
- Under the terms of the Treaty of Kars, Soviet territory in the western Armenian SSR was ceded back to Turkey, including Mount Ararat of Biblical fame, as the former Kars Oblast came under Turkish control as the Kars Province and the Ardahan Province.
- Born: Carlo Furno, Italian Roman Catholic Cardinal; in Bairo, Kingdom of Italy (d. 2015)

== December 3, 1921 (Saturday) ==
- For the first time, the championship of Canadian football, the Grey Cup was played between the best team in Western Canada and the best in Eastern Canada. The Toronto Argonauts defeated the visiting Edmonton Eskimos (who were unrelated to the CFL team of the same name that is now the Edmonton Elks), winning 23 to 0 at Varsity Stadium.

== December 4, 1921 (Sunday) ==
- The Irish nationalist delegates rejected the British settlement offer of Dominion status, in that it continued to require an oath of allegiance to the British crown for all government members, and continued the partition of the island of Ireland.
- A delegation representing the "Far Eastern Republic" arrived in Washington, D.C., in hopes of obtaining American help in driving Japanese troops from Siberia and seeking diplomatic recognition.

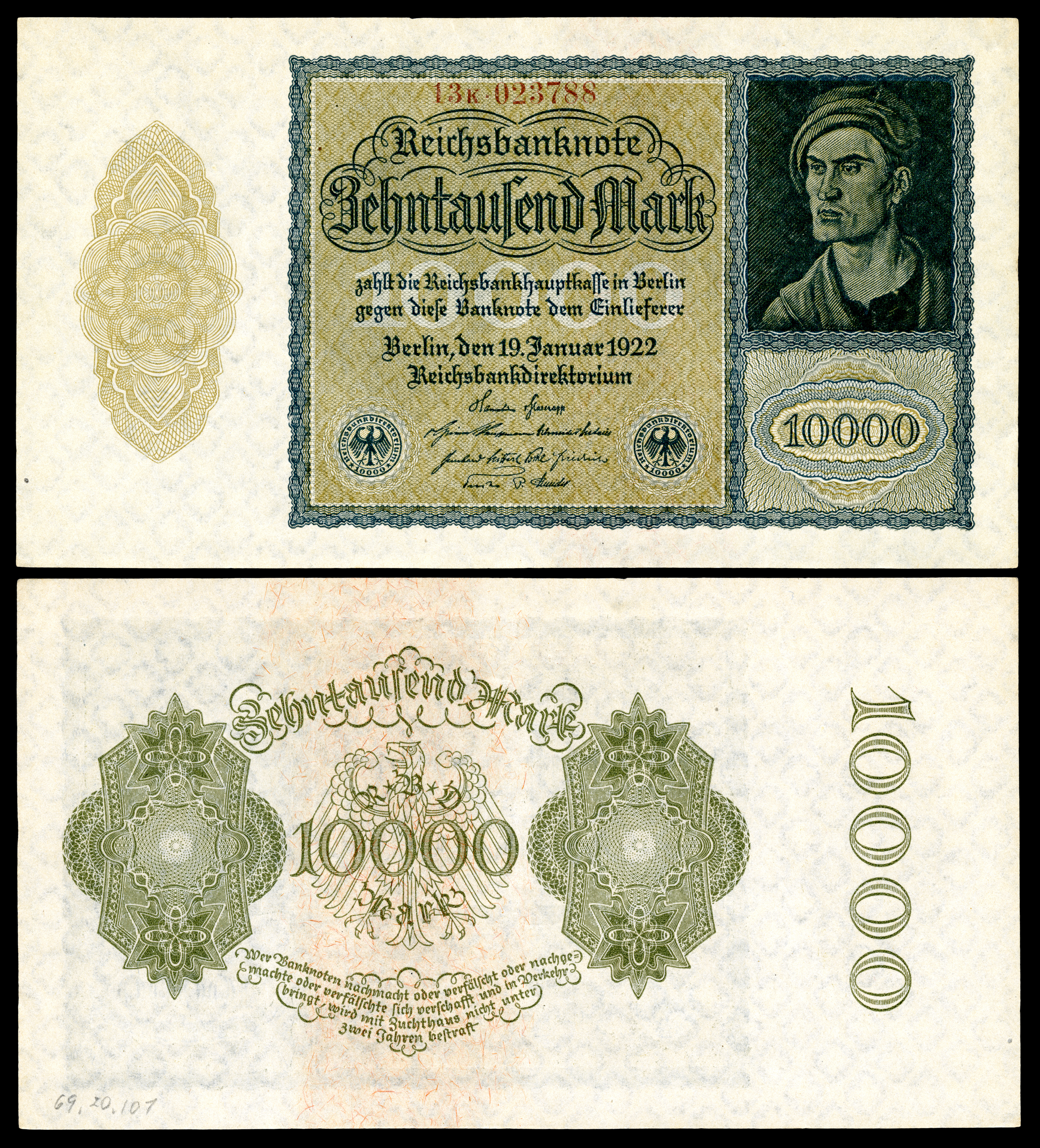
10,000 Mark note, worth $52 in January 1922, $3.15 in January 1923

- The value of Germany's currency, referred to retrospectively as the "paper" Mark (Papiermark), dropped sharply on announcements that the cost of living had increased by 22% during the month of November, and that prices were almost 60 percent higher than they had been at the beginning of the year.
- In a game that decided the second championship of the NFL, the Chicago Staleys (now the Chicago Bears) beat the previously undefeated Buffalo All-Americans, 10 to 7. Buffalo had ended its scheduled games with a 9-0-2 record and its owner had agreed to the December 4 game in the belief that it was a post-season exhibition, while the Commissioner of the American Professional Football Association, which would adopt the name National Football League in 1922, ruled that Chicago was the league champion after both teams finished with records of 9 wins and 1 loss.
- Born: Deanna Durbin, Canadian singer; as Edna Mae Durban, in Winnipeg, Manitoba (d. 2013)

== December 5, 1921 (Monday) ==
- Irish revolutionary leader Michael Collins met UK prime minister David Lloyd George at 10 Downing Street to discuss the remaining "points of difference" between the two sides, and came to an agreement that retained the division of Ireland, but accepted dominion status for the predominantly Roman Catholic southern provinces and eliminated the requirement of an oath of allegiance.
- The Football Association, governing body of association football in England, banned women from playing at FA-affiliated pitches, the only ones with spectator facilities, saying that "the game of football was quite unsuitable for females."
- More than 20 people were killed in a train wreck near Philadelphia at Woodmont.
- The 67th United States Congress, elected more than a year earlier in 1920, convened its first regular session. The first order of business was the 1922-1923 U.S. budget sent over by U.S. president Warren G. Harding, showing a deficit of $167,571,977.
- The U.S. Supreme Court ruled that picketing during labor strikes was a lawful exercise of the First Amendment right of free speech, but that it could be subject to an injunction if obstruction or intimidation were used.
- Born: Alvy Moore, American actor; as Jack Alvin Moore, in Vincennes, Indiana (d. 1997)

== December 6, 1921 (Tuesday) ==
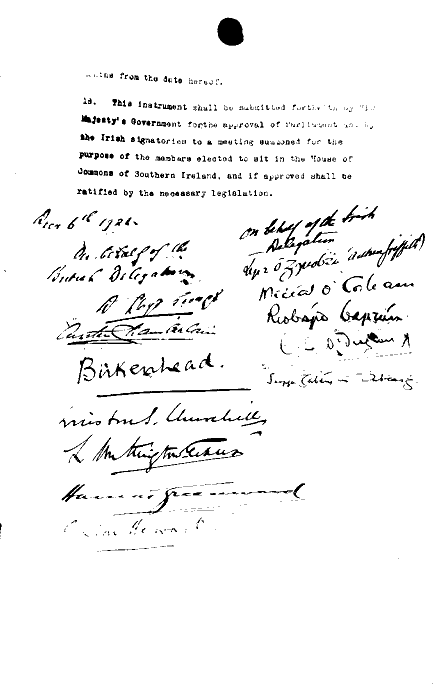
The signed treaty

- The Anglo-Irish Treaty establishing the Irish Free State, an independent nation incorporating 26 of Ireland's 32 counties, was signed at the Cabinet Room of 10 Downing Street in London at 2:00 in the morning by British and Irish negotiators, bringing to an end to the Irish War of Independence.
- In elections for the Canadian House of Commons, the Liberal Party of W. L. Mackenzie King won an overwhelming majority of the 225 seats over the ruling Conservative Party, led by Prime Minister Arthur Meighen. Although Meighen's Conservatives had had a 153 to 82 lead in the House before the election, they lost 104 seats, with Meighen himself and 11 members of his cabinet losing their bids for re-election as MPs. After the voting, the Liberals had 118 seats, the new Progressives had 58 and the Conservatives had only 59. In the voting, Agnes Macphail of the Progressives became the first woman to be elected to the Canadian Parliament.
- Said Halim Pasha, the former Grand Vizier of the Ottoman Empire from 1913 to 1917, was assassinated in Rome while driving back to the home at Piazza Colonna . According to reports at the time, Halim was shot from a distance of six feet and fell dead inside his vehicle, and his secretary climbed in and, "not aware that his master was dead, ordered the coachman to chase the man who fired, and for half an hour the carriage, with the old statesman's corpse still inside, pursued the assassin until the secretary gave up the chase in vain."
- U.S. President Warren G. Harding addressed a joint session of Congress to present his State of the Union address in person rather than sending it over to be read out loud. Harding advocated early refunding of foreign debts, increased regulation of non-taxable securities, providing relief for cooperative agriculture associations, a flexible tariff, and other reforms, and a hope that humanitarian aid could be increased to relieve the famine in Soviet Russia.
- The names of 11,000 U.S. draft dodgers, as determined by the U.S. Department of War, were ordered published in the Congressional Record.
- In discussions at the Washington Disarmament Conference over the dispute between China and Japan over the Shandong Peninsula, China agreed to reimburse money spent by Japan for improvements to Shandong, and Japan agreed to return all public property under lease in Kiau-Chau.
- France's Prime Minister Aristide Briand received a 249 to 12 vote of confidence from the French Senate for his foreign policy, a 400 to 100 approval by the French Chamber of Deputies.
- Future Indian Prime Minister Jawaharlal Nehru, then 32, was arrested along with his father for the first time in his life for his participation in a strike as part of Mahatma Gandhi's Non-Cooperation movement.
- The first penalty shot in the history of ice hockey was taken in one of the first games of the Pacific Coast Hockey Association, which had recently adopted the rule. The shot missed and it would be six more days before a goal was scored on a penalty shot.
- Died: Félix Arnaudin, 77, French folklorist and photographer (b. 1844)

== December 7, 1921 (Wednesday) ==
- Guatemala's president Carlos Herrera was deposed in a coup d'état led by Guatemalan Army General José María Orellana and José Maria Lima.
- In London, King George V summoned parliament to ratify the Irish treaty, while Irish President Éamon de Valera called on similar approval from his cabinet in Dublin. Sir James Craig, the premier of Northern Ireland, asked the Stormont Assembly to delay any action on ratifying the agreement.
- A violent riot, involving an estimated 360,000 people, broke out in the U.S. city of Chicago when police attempted to make arrests during picketing by striking meatpackers. Nine people were shot, one fatally, and violence spread to Omaha, Nebraska and South St. Paul, Minnesota.
- Died: Nathan Cole Jr., 60-61, American newspaper publisher and co-founder of the Los Angeles Daily Times, now the Los Angeles Times (b. 1860)

== December 8, 1921 (Thursday) ==
- A U.S. Senate subcommittee investigating capital punishment in the U.S. Army announced that only 11 of the servicemen given the death sentence during World War I had actually been executed.
- Irish republican leader Éamon de Valera declared that, after discussions with his cabinet, he and two ministers were opposed to ratification of the Anglo-Irish peace treaty, but referred the matter to the Irish parliament, Dáil Éireann, for further discussion. De Valera asked the Irish people to continue orderly conduct during the debate. Arthur Griffith, one of the Irish republicans who had signed the treaty as a delegate, declared that he was strongly in favor of ratification.
- Died: Henry D. Flood, 56, American politician, served as the U.S. Congressman for Virginia from 1901 until his death (b. 1865)

== December 9, 1921 (Friday) ==
- All 43 crew were rescued from the U.S. Navy submarine S-48 after it sank in waters 80 feet (24 m) deep in Long Island Sound, during the sub's first sea trial after departing from New York. A civilian mechanic from Bridgeport, Connecticut, Peter F. Dunne, conceived a plan to raise the bow of the ship above the surface, where the crew was able to escape through a torpedo tube.
- The strong anti-knocking effect of the lead compound tetraethyllead (TEL) in gasoline was discovered by Charles F. Kettering, Thomas Midgley Jr. and Thomas Boyd at the General Motors laboratories in the United States.
- The Estonian cargo ship Saaremaa collided with another ship off Kronstadt, part of the Soviet Union, and sank with the loss of 23 lives.
- The last Irish republican political prisoners were released from the Ballykinlar prison in Northern Ireland, a little more than three weeks after the shooting of Tadhg Barry.
- Anti-Christian pamphleteer John William Gott became the last person in England to be publicly prosecuted and imprisoned for blasphemous libel. Gott, who had several prior jail sentences for blasphemy, had published a satire of the Christian religion in a pamphlet, including the statement that Jesus Christ had entered Jerusalem "like a circus clown on the back of two donkeys" and was sentenced to nine months imprisonment at hard labor. Shortly after his release in August, he died on November 4, 1922, at the age of 56.
- Negotiations between China and Japan broke down when Japan announced that it would not cede the Tsingtao to Tsinan railroad to Chinese control, regardless of compensation.
- Died: Sir Arthur Pearson, 55, British newspaper magnate and publisher who founded the Daily Express, a London afternoon tabloid, in 1900; accidentally died after falling in his bathtub, striking his head, and drowning (b. 1866)

== December 10, 1921 (Saturday) ==
- The United States and Germany re-established full diplomatic relations after a break of nearly five years, as Ellis Loring Dresel presented his credentials as the U.S. chargé d'affaires to German president Friedrich Ebert.
- The English Ladies Football Association was founded in Liverpool by representatives of 30 women's soccer football teams, five days after the ban by the Football Association of the use of FA stadiums by women.
- The Nobel Prizes were awarded in Stockholm, and the 1921 Nobel Peace Prize was divided equally between Prime Minister Hjalmar Branting of Sweden and Christian L. Lange of Norway.
- Born:
  - Cornell Mayer, American radio astronomer who made the first accurate measures of the temperature of the planet Venus in 1958; in Ossian, Iowa (d. 2005)
  - Toh Chin Chye, Singaporean statesman and academic, first Deputy Prime Minister of Singapore after its separation from Malaysia; in Batu Gajah, Perak, Federated Malay States ((d. 2012)
  - Frank P. Witek, U.S. Marine and posthumous Medal of Honor recipient; in Derby, Connecticut (d. 1944, killed in action)
- Died:
  - George Ashlin, 84, Irish architect (b. 1837)
  - Victor Jacobi, 38, Hungarian operetta composer; died of an unknown illness while visiting New York City (b. 1883)

== December 11, 1921 (Sunday) ==
- In British India, Indian National Congress president-elect Chittaranjan Das (C. R. Das) and Bengal Caliphate Committee president Abul Kalam Azad were arrested by colonial authorities along with about 600 other independence advocates under the terms of the India Sedition Act, to prevent protests during the tour of Edward, Prince of Wales.
- The United States and Japan reached an agreement regarding the island of Yap and other South Pacific islands under mandate, with Japanese sovereignty recognized in return for the U.S. having equal rights with Japan on access to undersea cables and wireless service, as well as a guarantee that American missionaries and educators would be protected.
- Alexandru Averescu announced his resignation as Prime Minister of Romania, along with his cabinet of ministers.

== December 12, 1921 (Monday) ==
- As Germany's economic crisis worsened, the German Federal Council increased the rates for all communication (postal, telephone, telegraph) and railway transportation to a new level that was 20 times as much as it had been before World War I.
- In an attempt to resolve the dispute between Chile and Peru over the legal status of the Tacna and Arica territory on the borders of the two nations, Chile proposed that a plebiscite be held among the residents of the area in South America.
- At Allahabad in India, the visit of the Prince of Wales was welcomed by a small crowd of British residents, while almost all native Indians boycotted the ceremonies.
- In the town of Franklin, Kansas, a group of 2,000 immigrants, mostly women whose husbands were striking miners, formed a mob and attacked non-union labor that had come to replace the strikers, using red pepper and throwing rocks. The Kansas National Guard was sent in to restore order.
- Britain extended the India Sedition Act to its territory in Burma, where the Prince of Wales was scheduled to visit.
- Died: Henrietta Swan Leavitt, 53, American astronomer; died of stomach cancer (b. 1868)

== December 13, 1921 (Tuesday) ==
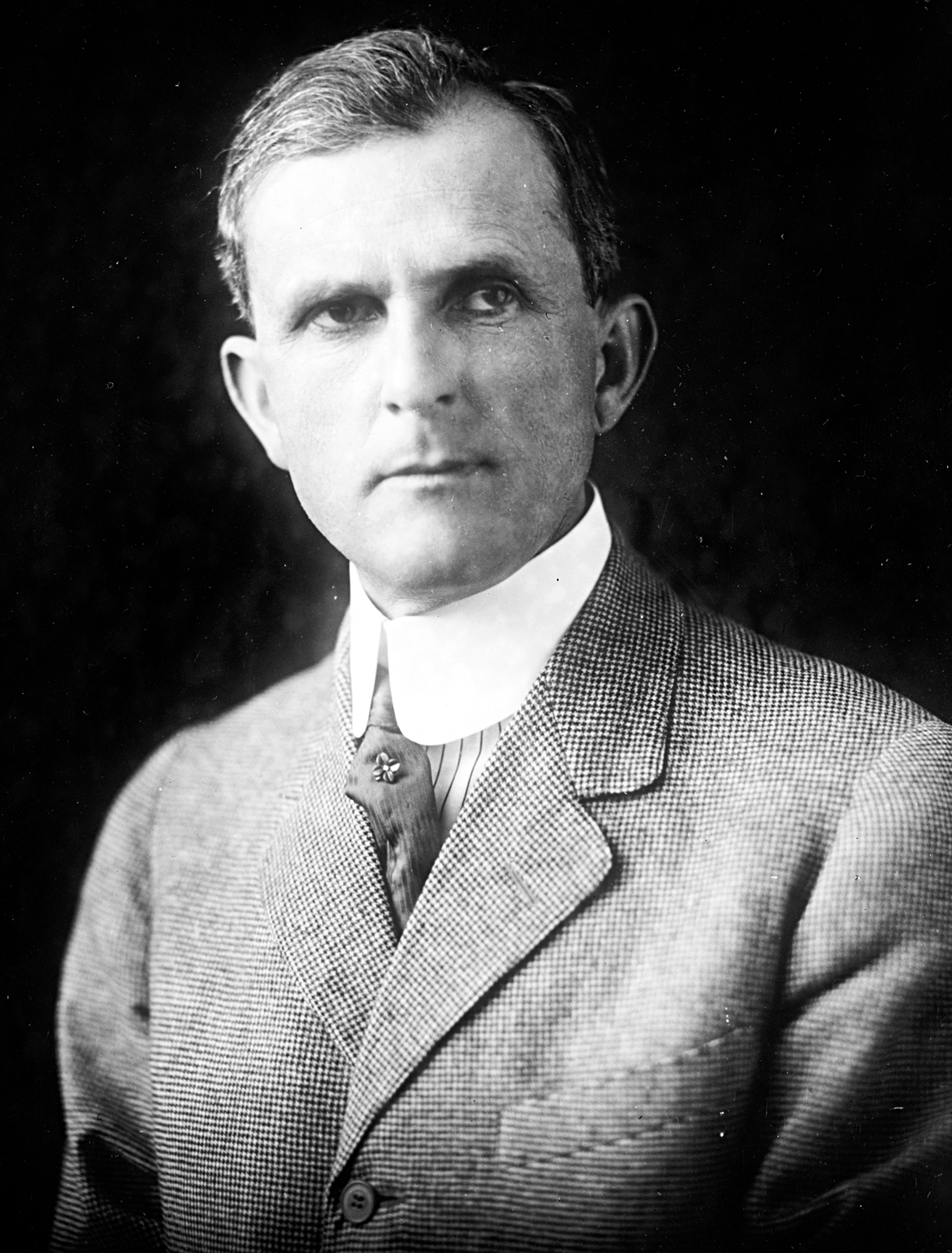
Congressman John A. Elston

- John A. Elston, 47, a member of the U.S. House of Representatives from California since 1915, committed suicide at the age of 47 by drowning himself in the Potomac River. Elston, who represented the area around the San Francisco Bay, left a suicide note in his coat, found at the bank of the river near the Washington Monument. He wrote "I am in a chain of circumstances that spell ruin, although my offense was innocently made in the beginning. I hope all the facts will come out. Staying means embarrassment to my district and to a worthy people, clean and generous." Earlier in the day, Elston had failed to answer roll call in the House and detectives looked for him, taking him to get medical attention. Hours later, he disappeared again and his body was found two days later.
- Signing the Four-Power Treaty on Insular Possessions, Japan, the United States, United Kingdom, and France agreed to recognize the status quo in the Pacific Ocean, pledging not to interfere with each other's territories.
- The U.S. Railroad Labor Board ruled that "time-and-a-half" overtime pay would not be required except when a worker had been on the job for more than ten hours on a shift, but restricted railroads to scheduling workers for no more than an eight-hour shift, with allowance for overruns.

== December 14, 1921 (Wednesday) ==
- Japan agreed to accept the "5:5:3 ratio" on total tonnage of ships in the Imperial Japanese Navy, with Japan to have 3/5ths as many warships in its fleet as the United States Navy and the Royal Navy of the United Kingdom. U.S. Secretary of State Charles Evans Hughes had proposed the limitation on November 12, based on the total amount of coastline (including colonial possessions) that each nation had to defend. Numerically, the United Kingdom would have 20 warships totaling 582,050 tons; the United States would have 18 warships combining for 525,850 tons; and Japan would have 10 warships at 313,300 tons.
- The Allied Reparation Commission announced that it had been delivered forfeited German ships that the Commission valued as being worth 756 million gold marks based on the worth of the German mark at the end of World War I.

== December 15, 1921 (Thursday) ==
- Germany informed the Allied Reparation Commission that, because of the worsening economic crisis, Germany would be unable to pay the installments due in January and February 1922.
- Born: Alan Freed, American disk jockey credited with coining the term "rock and roll"; as Albert Freed, in Windber, Pennsylvania (d. 1965)
- Died: Sir John Eccles Nixon, 64, British Indian Army general who was blamed for the disastrous Mesopotamian Campaign against the Ottoman Army during World War I (b. 1857)

== December 16, 1921 (Friday) ==
- Both houses of the Parliament of the United Kingdom approved Prime Minister Lloyd George's agreement to create the Irish Free State, 401 to 58 in the House of Commons and 166 to 47 in the House of Lords.
- The British cargo ship Stevenstone left Blyth, Northumberland, for Helsingør, Denmark, and was never seen again. It was presumed to have foundered with the loss of all hands.
- Sergei Prokofiev's Piano Concerto No. 3 was performed for the first time, by the Chicago Symphony Orchestra; Prokofiev himself performed the piano solo during the premiere concert.
- The Israeli village of Kfar Yehezkel was founded as a moshav ovdim settlement in the northern part of the British Mandate for Palestine.
- Died:
  - Camille Saint-Saëns, 86, French composer of Romantic classical music, including the popular musical suite, The Carnival of the Animals, which he had refused to allow performance of during his lifetime; died of a heart attack (b. 1835)
  - Sir Boshan Wei Yuk, 72, prominent Hong Kong banking magnate, who, in 1867, became the first Chinese student to obtain an education in Europe (b. 1849)

== December 17, 1921 (Saturday) ==
- As the Washington Disarmament Conference continued, U.S. Secretary of State Charles Evans Hughes modified the 5:5:3 ratio to a "5-5-3-1.75-1.75", with the navies of France and Italy to have 35% as much total warship tonnage as the U.S. or the British Navy.
- U.S. President Harding eliminated the fringe benefit of free rent and utilities for all U.S. civilian employees working in the Panama Canal Zone, and directed that the government workers would be responsible for their own expenses.
- Peru rejected the Chilean proposal for a plebiscite to determine the status of the Tacna-Arica region, and made a counter-proposal that the matter be submitted for arbitration by a neutral party.
- Crewmen from the Argentine Navy battleship ARA Almirante Brown, defending the coast, rowed boats ashore to successfully capture a group of about 250 armed bandits at Matatapera in Santa Cruz Province.
- The U.S.–Hungarian Peace Treaty, signed on August 29, went into effect as instruments of ratification were exchanged, ending the state of war between the U.S. and the Austro-Hungarian Empire.
- The earliest known example of the moth species Batrachedra astricta was discovered and collected by entomologist Charles E. Clarke at Opoho in New Zealand.
- Born: Nadezhda Popova, Soviet Air Force officer, awarded Hero of the Soviet Union for her leadership of the 46th Guards Night Bomber Regiment during World War II; in Shabanovka, Orel Oblast, Russian SFSR, Soviet Union(d. 2013)
- Died:
  - Gabriela Zapolska, 64, Polish stage actress, playwright, and novelist (b. 1858)
  - RAF Captain Edmund Tempest, 27, British flying ace during World War I with 17 victories; killed in an accidental plane crash while serving in Baghdad (b. 1894)

== December 18, 1921 (Sunday) ==
- Austria and Czechoslovakia adjourned their international conference over border disputes and agreed to submit further controversies to international arbitration.
- Poland's football team played its first international match, losing 1 to 0 to Hungary in a match in Budapest.

== December 19, 1921 (Monday) ==
- Take Ionescu became the new Prime Minister of Romania, succeeding Alexandru Averescu.
- Born: Blaže Koneski, Macedonian poet and linguist who set a standard for the Macedonian language; in Nebregovo, Yugoslavia (present-day North Macedonia) (d. 1993)

== December 20, 1921 (Tuesday) ==
- Liang Shiyi became the new Premier of the Republic of China, succeeding Yan Huiqing.
- Sir George Fuller took office as the new Premier of the Australian state of New South Wales, seven days after Premier James Dooley lost a vote of confidence in the state legislature. Only seven hours after Fuller had formed a government and became the head of government as premier, he lost another vote of confidence in the legislature and was not seated. On December 27, Dooley was appointed premier again after forming a new government.
- The U.S. Senate voted to pass the Russian Famine Relief Act and approved the appropriation of $20,000,000 ($300 million in 2021) for that purpose, pursuant to the request of President Harding and following the approval by the House on December 17, subject to the condition that all purchases of food be made in the U.S. and shipped to the Soviet Union in American vessels.
- Died:
  - Julius Richard Petri, 69, German microbiologist and inventor of the Petri dish (b. 1852)
  - Dmitri Parsky, 55, Russian general of the Imperial Russian Army during World War I; died of typhus (b. 1866)
  - Hans von Beseler, 71, German colonel general, led the Siege of Antwerp during World War I and forced the surrender of Antwerp, then served as the military Governor-General of the German puppet state Regency Kingdom of Poland (b. 1850)

== December 21, 1921 (Wednesday) ==
- The Italian-built airship Roma, purchased by the U.S. Army, was commissioned to service and made a demonstration flight over Washington, D.C.
- Groundbreaking took place for the Los Angeles Memorial Coliseum, an outdoor stadium which would be completed on May 1, 1923, would host the 1932 and the 1984 Summer Olympics, and would continue to host sporting events nearly 100 years later.
- Born:
  - Luigi Creatore, American songwriter and record producer; in New York City (d. 2015)
  - Lorna Lippmann, Australian researcher and Aboriginal rights activist (d. 2004)
- Died: James W. Cannon, 69, American textile manufacturer, founder of the Cannon Mills Company, at one time the world's largest producer of towels (b. 1852)

== December 22, 1921 (Thursday) ==
- At the Washington Disarmament Conference, Arthur Lee, First Lord of the Admiralty for the United Kingdom, proposed the abolition of all submarine warships. At the time, the U.S. and Britain had over 80,000 tons of submarines, while Japan, France, and Italy had less than 35,000.
- Died: Henry Watterson, 81, American newspaper publisher and founder of The Courier-Journal of Louisville, Kentucky, in 1868 (b. 1840)

== December 23, 1921 (Friday) ==
- Visva-Bharati College was founded by Rabindranath Tagore in Santiniketan, Bengal Presidency, British India, with a Memorandum of Association to the University of Calcutta.
- Chinese warlord Zhang Zuolin, the Governor of Manchuria, reorganized his government appointing Yan Huiqing as Foreign Minister, and new ministers for finance and for communications.

== December 24, 1921 (Saturday) ==
- Forty-four people were killed and one hundred more injured in tornadoes that swept across the U.S. states of Arkansas, Louisiana, and Mississippi on Christmas Eve.
- Colombia ratified the treaty with the United States recognizing the independence of Panama, a former Colombian province that had been declared a separate nation after the intervention of the U.S. in 1903.
- The New Economic Policy of the Soviet Union, created by Premier Vladimir Lenin, was approved by the 9th All-Russian Soviet Congress.
- The first radio station in France, Radio Tour Eiffel, began broadcasting from a studio near the Eiffel Tower, where the transmitter was installed. The inaugural broadcast, of 30 minutes, consisted of an engineer with the message, "Allô, allô, ici poste militaire de la Tour Eiffel" ("Hello, hello, this is the military post of the Eiffel Tower.") Regular transmissions would begin on February 6.

== December 25, 1921 (Sunday) ==
- Socialist Party of America leader Eugene V. Debs was released from federal prison, along with 23 other inmates who had been convicted of violating anti-sedition laws during World War I, after U.S. President Harding commuted their sentences to time served.
- The British cargo ship Atherton capsized in the Thames Estuary near the Girdlers Lightship. Its crew was rescued by SS Falcon before it sank.
- Died: Vladimir Korolenko, 68, Ukrainian-born Russian novelist and human rights activist; died of complications from pneumonia (b. 1853)

== December 26, 1921 (Monday) ==
- The Kingdom of Italy signed its first trade agreement with the Soviet Union, a prelude to full diplomatic recognition with the Communist government in 1924. One historian noted that the pact "signified the de facto recognition of the Soviet government by its Italian counterpart."
- Born:
  - Steve Allen, American comedian and TV personality, known for being the co-creator and first host of The Tonight Show, the first nationwide late night talk show; in New York City (d. 2000)
  - Steven Ritch, American horror film actor best known for portraying the title character in The Werewolf in 1956; in Providence, Rhode Island (d. 1995)

== December 27, 1921 (Tuesday) ==
- Chile agreed with Peru to send delegates to Washington to resolve the Tacna-Arica dispute and to submit unsettled questions to arbitration.
- Philippe Berthelot resigned as Foreign Minister of France after criticism of his relationship with the Bank of China in Paris.
- Born:
  - Robert Lipshutz, American attorney who served as chief White House Counsel during the presidency of Jimmy Carter from 1977 to 1979; in Atlanta (d. 2010)
  - Judith Wallerstein, American psychologist and researcher; as Judith Saretsky, in New York City (d. 2012)
- Died: Gustav Mullins, 67, British portrait photographer of European royalty and celebrities (b. 1854)

== December 28, 1921 (Wednesday) ==
- The "Rand Rebellion" in South Africa began as a strike of gold miners in the Witwatersrand mining region, and would spread in the next three months as an armed takeover of the towns of Benoni and Brakpan, and spread to the Johannesburg suburbs of Fordsburg and Jeppestown before being suppressed in March with the loss of 200 lives.

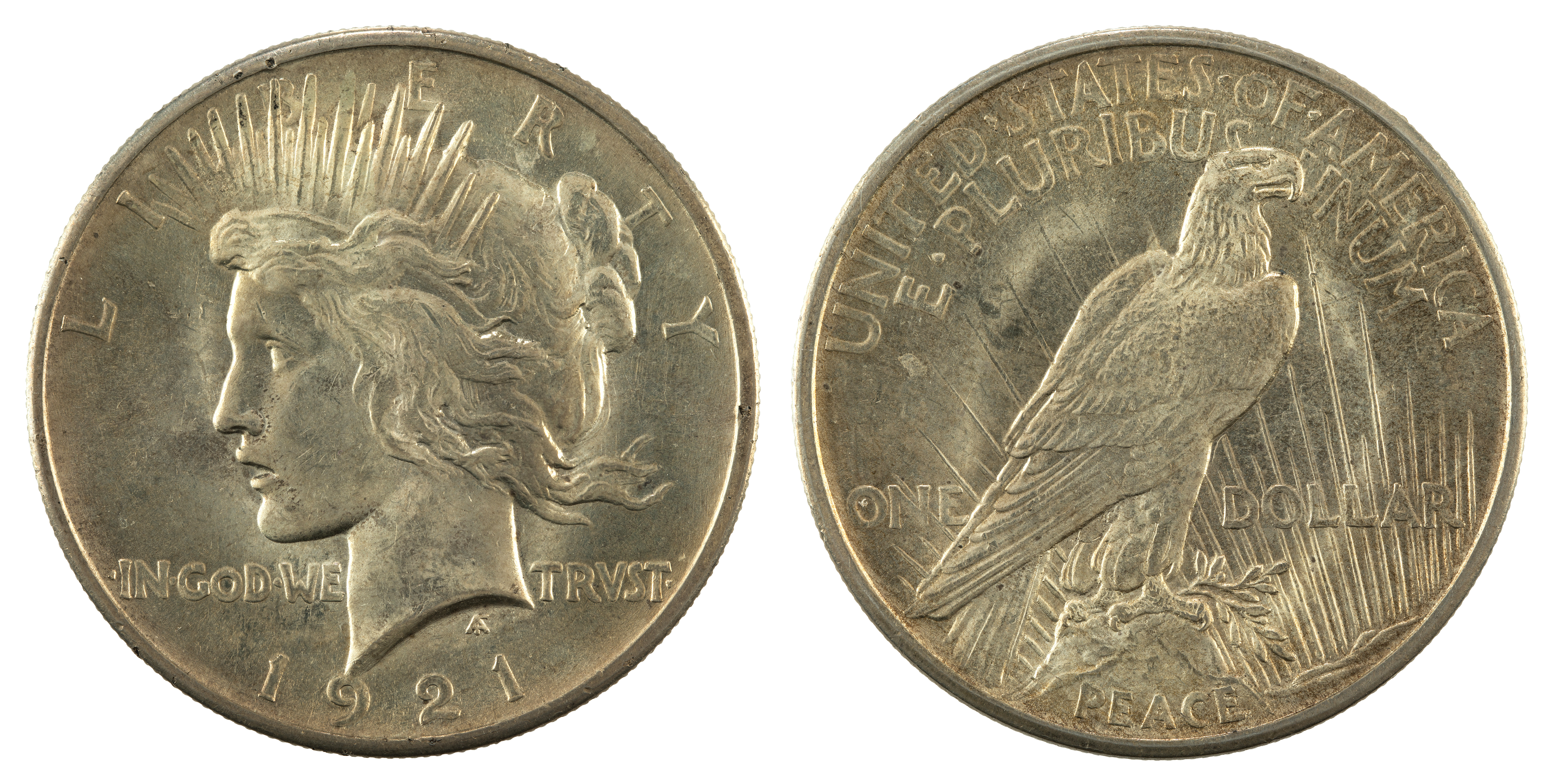
The new Peace Dollar

- The first of the "Peace dollar" U.S. silver dollars was minted, and the coin would be used through most of the 1920s.
- Italy's Banca Italiana di Sconto went bankrupt. The bank was granted a moratorium of one year to resolve its financial problems.
- The Indian National Congress voted to adhere to the Non-Cooperation movement advocated by the Mahatma Gandhi.

== December 29, 1921 (Thursday) ==
- Liberal leader William Lyon Mackenzie King became Canada's tenth prime minister.

== December 30, 1921 (Friday) ==
- Saad Zaghloul, the former Prime Minister of Egypt, was deported by British authorities to Ceylon (now Sri Lanka), roughly 3,500 miles (5,600 km) away. Sent with Zaghloul were five of his political allies, after the British government concluded that the original plan for exile on the island of Malta was insufficient.

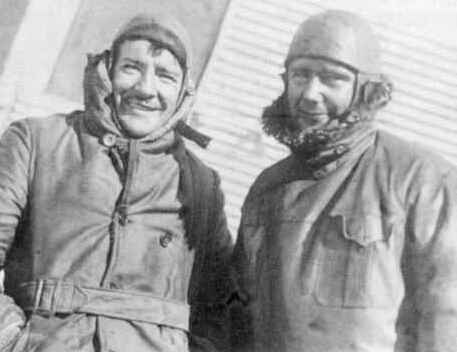
Stinson and Bertaud

- A new record for airplane endurance was set by Edward Stinson and Lloyd W. Bertaud, who flew over 24 hours in a Larsen metal monoplane around Long Island after taking off from Mineola, New York. They finally landed after 26 hours, 19 minutes and 35 seconds.
- In what would become known as the “Gun Alley Murder” in Melbourne in Australia, a 12-year-old schoolgirl was raped and murdered after having last been seen near the Australian Wine Saloon, owned by Colin Campbell Ross. Ross was charged and convicted based on the testimony of two witnesses and circumstantial evidence, and would be hanged on April 24. More than 80 years later, DNA analysis of a key piece of evidence and doubts about the reliability of the witness would lead to a posthumous pardon by the Governor of the state of Victoria on May 27, 2008, the only pardon up to that time for a person executed in Australia.
- The British cargo ship SS Adderstone, with 19 crew aboard, departed from the River Tyne, on a two-day voyage to the German port of Hamburg and never arrived. The Adderstone apparently foundered and sank in the North Sea and no trace of the vessel was found.
- Born: Rashid Karami, Lebanese statesman, served as Prime Minister of Lebanon 8 times; in Miriata, State of Greater Lebanon (d. 1987, assassinated)
- Died: Claude Allin Shepperson, 54, British artist and illustrator (b. 1867)

== December 31, 1921 (Saturday) ==
- At the Washington Disarmament Conference, the U.S. and Japan reached an agreement on the use of telegraph cables on the South Pacific island of Yap, with the U.S. having exclusive use and responsibility for the cable to Guam, Japan to have the cable to Shanghai via Okinawa, and the Netherlands controlling the cable to Manado in the Dutch East Indies (now Indonesia).
- The men's singles tennis competition at the 1921 Australasian Championships in Perth, Australia, was won by Rice Gemmell.
- Born: Maurice Yaméogo, first president of Upper Volta; as Naoua Laguemba, in Koudougou, French Upper Volta (present-day Burkina Faso) (d. 1993)
- Died:
  - Roman Romanovich Rosen, 74, Russian diplomat, served as Russian Ambassador to the United States, negotiated the 1905 Treaty of Portsmouth to settle the Russo-Japanese War on terms favorable to Russia; died of pneumonia (b. 1847)
  - Boies Penrose, 61, American politician, U.S. Senator from Pennsylvania from 1897 until his death; died of a pulmonary embolism.
