= Sarah Robinson =

Sarah Robinson may refer to:

- Sarah Scott (1720–1795), née Robinson, English writer and social reformer
- Sarah Robinson (activist) (1834–1921), temperance movement activist in the British Army
- Sarah Jane Robinson, Irish-born American serial killer
- Sarah Robinson, Countess of Ripon (1793–1867), wife of F. J. Robinson, the prime minister of the United Kingdom
- Sarah Robinson-Duff (1868–1934), American operatic soprano and voice teacher

== Fictional ==
- Sarah Robinson, a character in 55 Days at Peking
- Sarah Robinson, a character in When the Boat Comes In
- Sarah Robinson, a character in Stranded

== Other uses ==
- Ifield Community College or Sarah Robinson School

== See also ==
- Sara Tappan Doolittle Robinson, American writer and historian
