= Gustav Mullins =

English photographer (1854–1921)

Gustav William Henry Mullins (1854 – 27 December 1921) was a British portrait photographer, patronised by Queen Victoria.

Gustav Mullins was a partner in the firm Hughes & Mullins, photographers, based at Union Street, Ryde, Isle of Wight. His firm held the Royal Warrant of appointment and photographed members of the British royal family and their guests at Osborne House, Queen Victoria’s holiday home on the island.

Gustav Mullins was born in St Helier, Jersey, in 1854. His father, Henry, was a local photographic agent.

In the 1880s, Gustav moved to the Isle of Wight, becoming first apprentice and then partner to Jabez Hughes at his studio at 60 Union Street, Ryde, where they traded as ‘Hughes and Mullins’. Mullins continued the business after Hughes’ death in 1884. In 1885, he was granted a Royal Warrant when the firm was named "Photographers to Her Majesty at Ryde".

In this role, Mullins captured some of the most famous images of Queen Victoria, including formal portraits taken on the day of the Diamond Jubilee celebrations on 22 June 1897. He also photographed members of the royal family including Princess Beatrice on her wedding day and the young Princess Patricia of Connaught.

In 1883, Gustav married Fanny Hulse from Malling in Kent; they lived in Ryde with their daughter Dora. Gustav Mullins died on 27 December 1921 and was buried at Ryde Cemetery.

Examples of Mullins’ photographs are today held in the Royal Collection at Windsor Castle, the National Portrait Gallery in London, and the National Archives in Kew.

== Some photographs ==
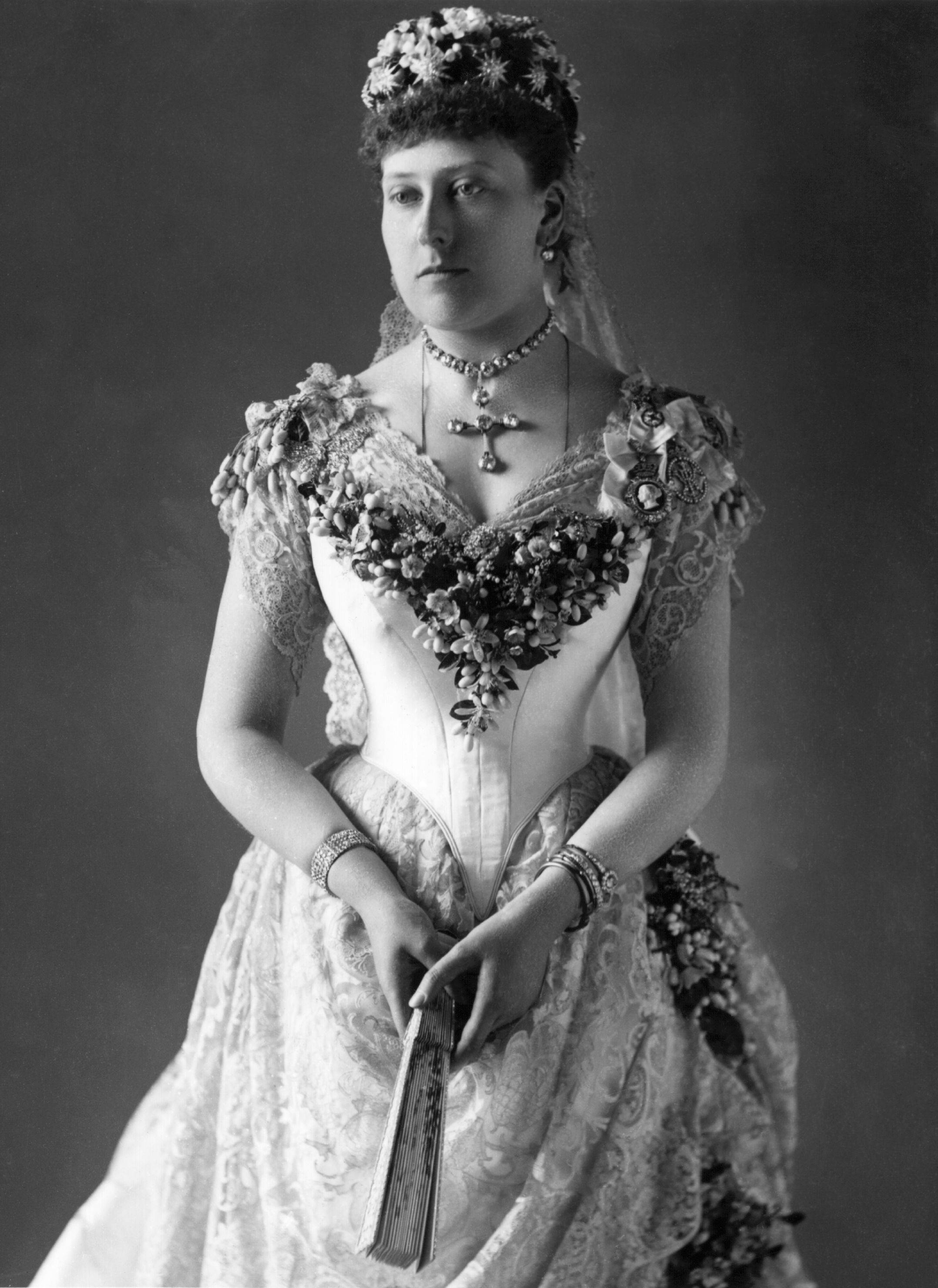
Princess Beatrice (1885)

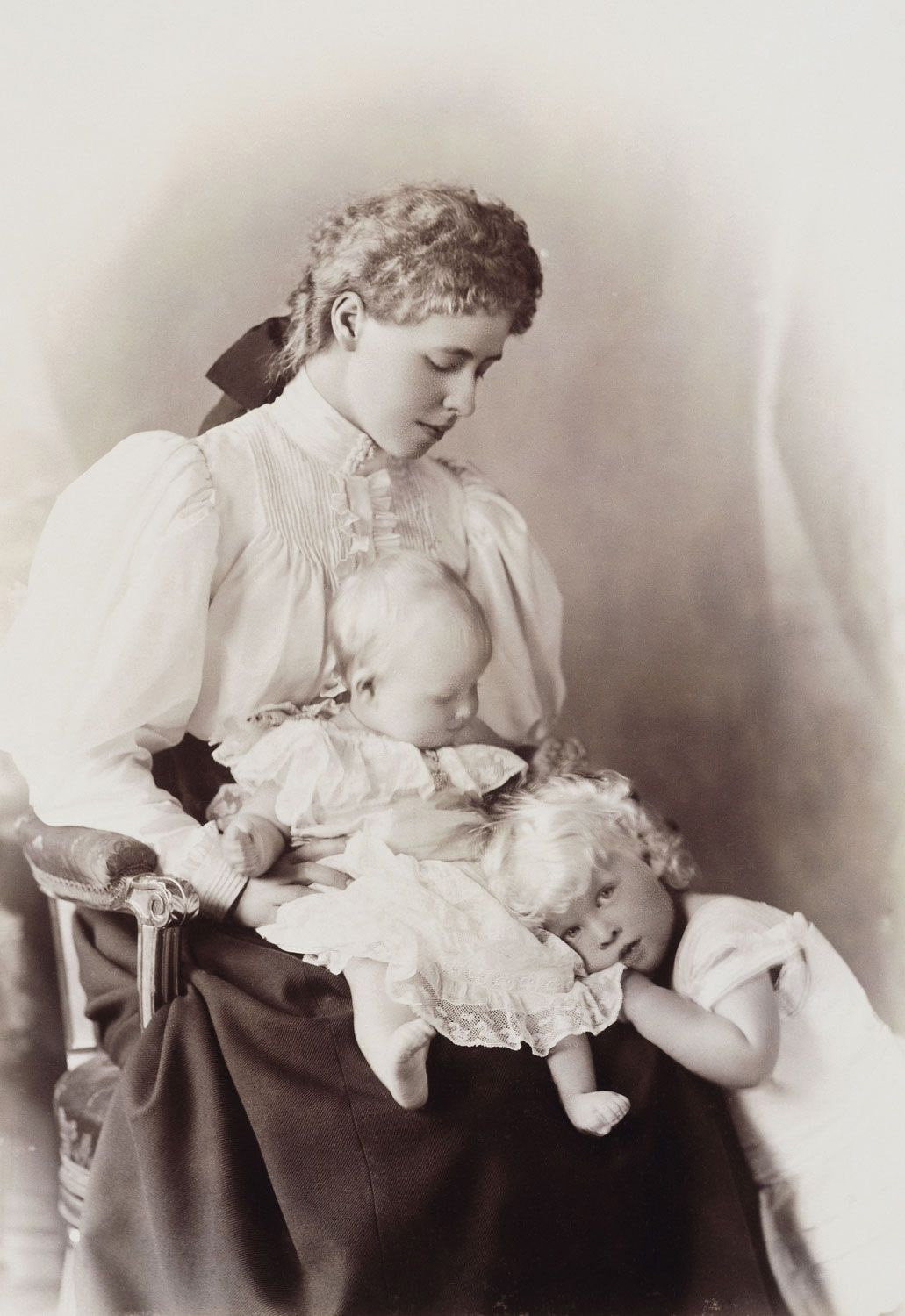
Marie of Romania (1895)

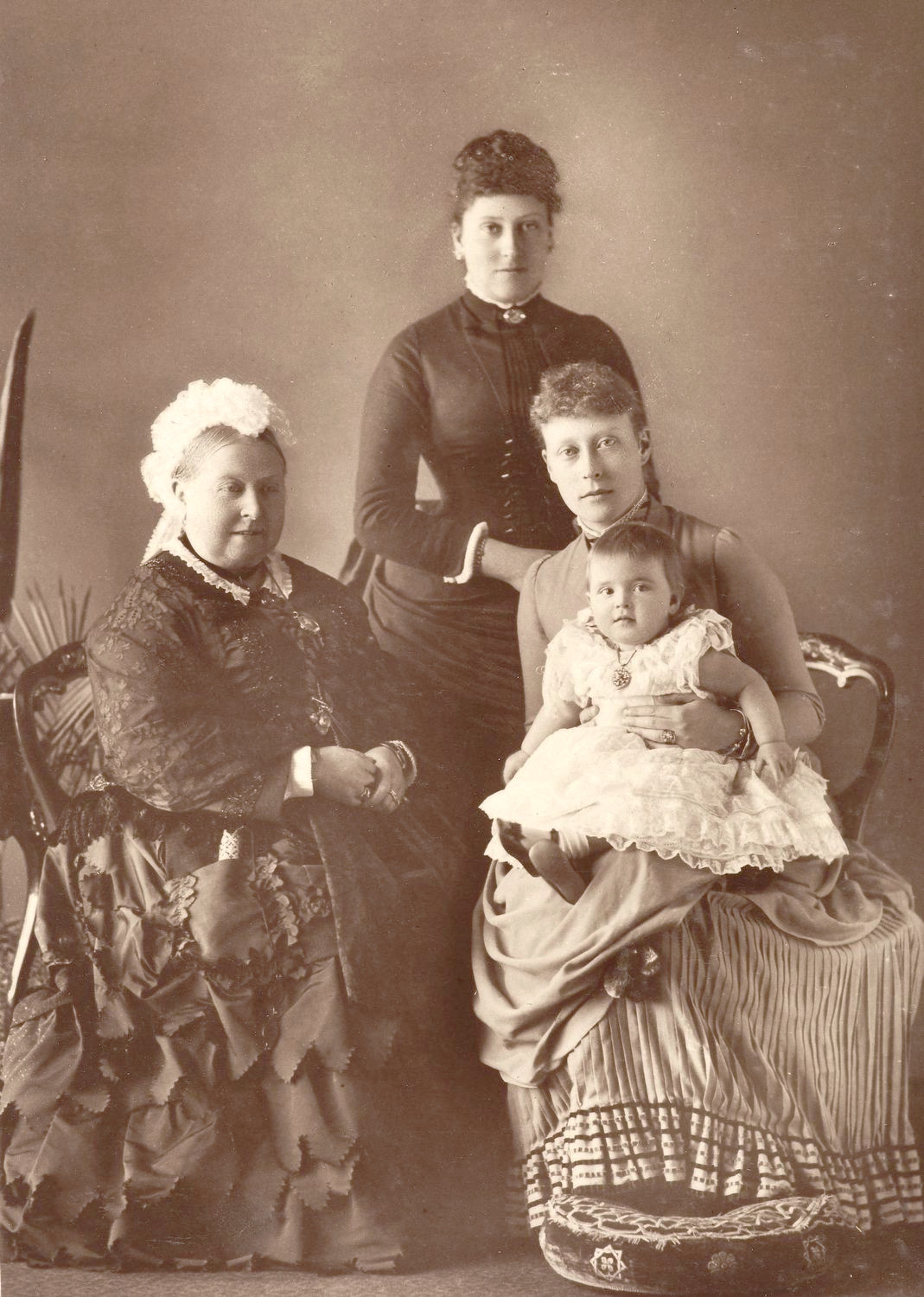
The Four Generations (1886)

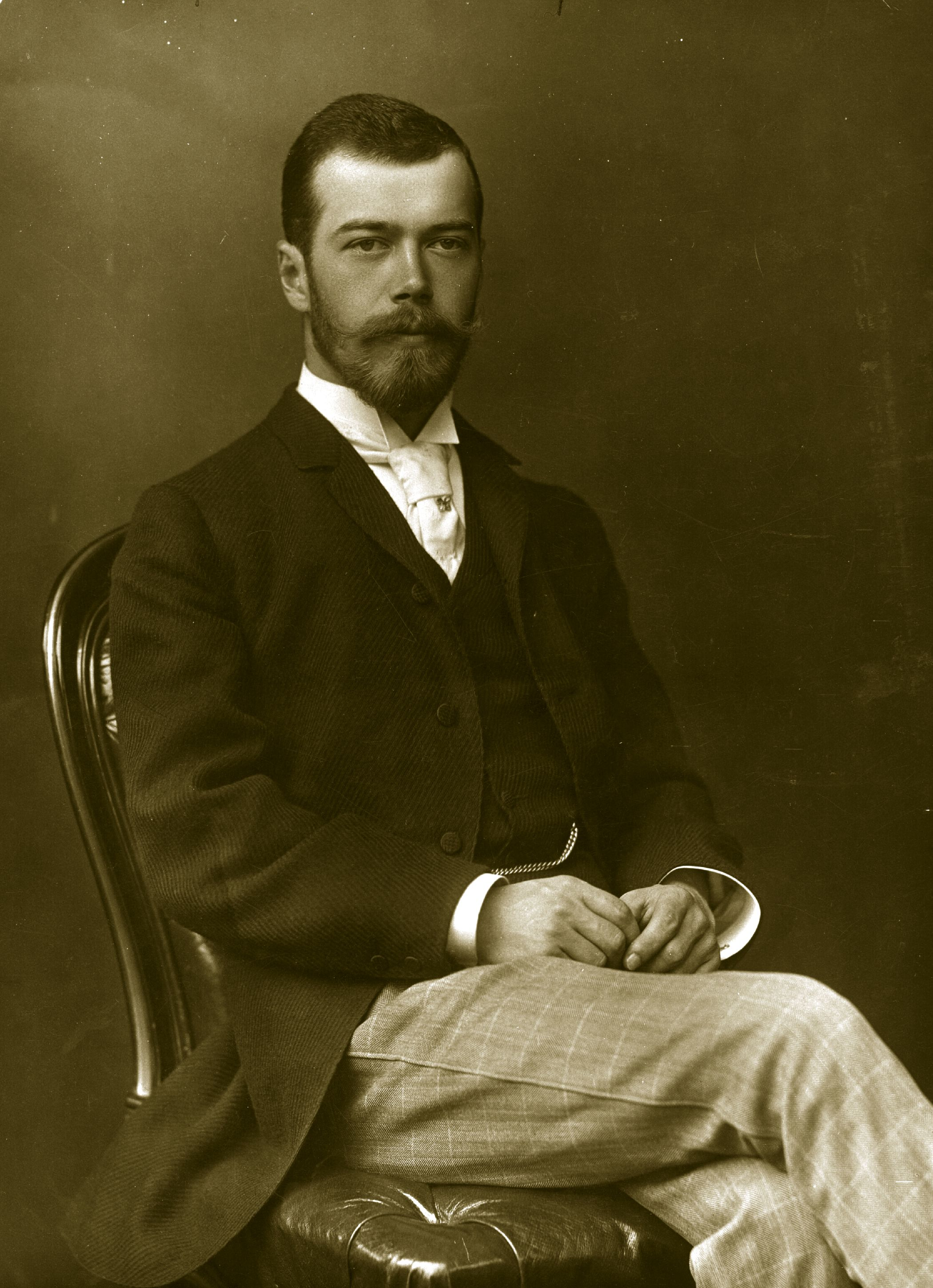
Nicholas II of Russia (1893)

== External sources ==
- Media related to Gustav Mullins at Wikimedia Commons
- IOW Photographers – Mullins
