= Shanghai opera =

Variety of Chinese opera

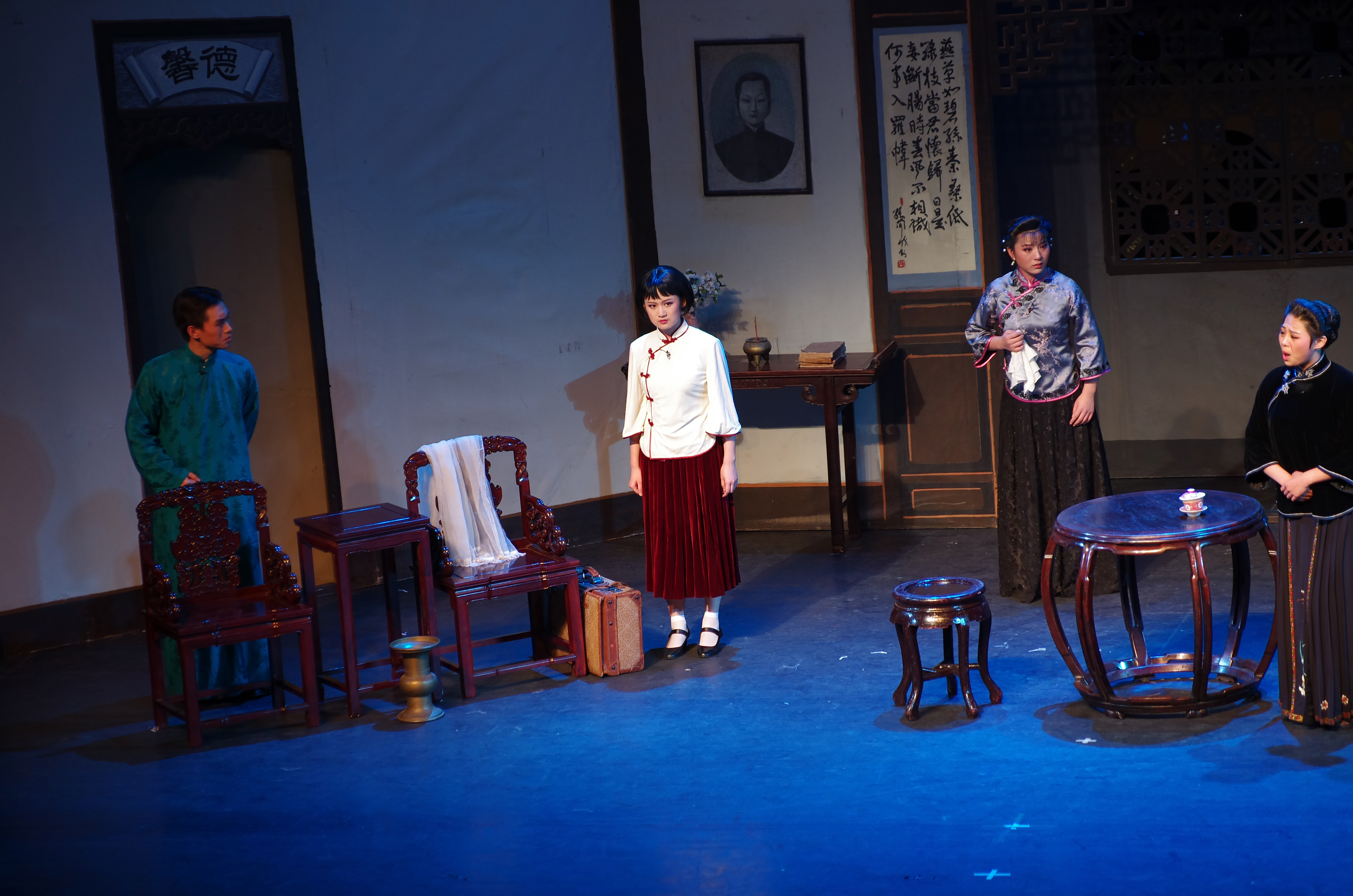
- Shanghai opera in 2013
- Native name: Huju (滬劇)
- Etymology: Hu, the abbreviation of Shanghai
- Other names: Shenqu (申曲)
- Origin: Qing dynasty (19th century)
- Major region: Shanghai
- Typical instruments: Erhu; Yangqin; Sanxian; Pipa; Dizi; Percussion
- Topolect: Shanghainese
- Tune system: Tanhuang

Shanghai opera
- Traditional Chinese: 滬劇
- Simplified Chinese: 沪剧
Transcriptions

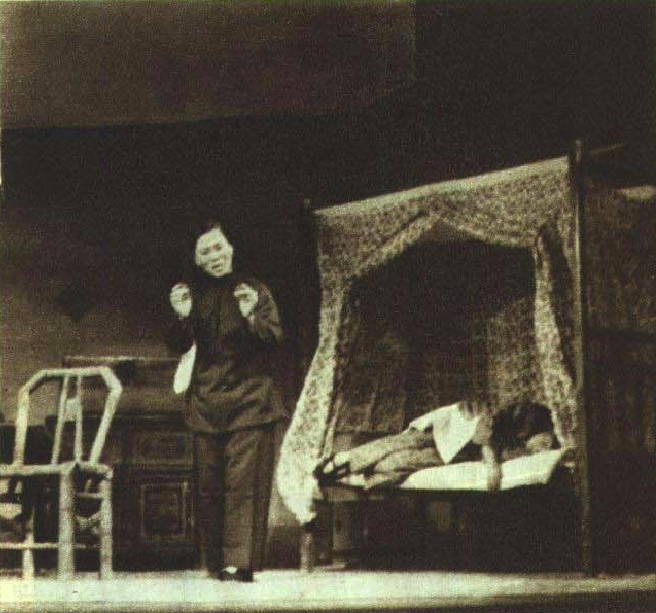
Huju "Luo Han Qian" in 1952

Shanghai opera (Chinese: 滬劇; pinyin: huju), formerly known as Shenqu (Chinese: 申曲; pinyin: shēnqǔ), is a variety of Chinese opera from Shanghai typically sung in Shanghainese. It is unique in Chinese opera in that virtually all dramas in its repertoire today are set in the modern era (20th and 21st centuries). This arose from Yue opera's dominance in Shanghai in the 1940s.

Huju is particularly popular in Baihe, the oldest town in the Qingpu District of Shanghai. There are eight to ten huju ensembles in the Baihe, and many local residents hire these ensembles to perform for weddings and funerals.

Huju is accompanied by traditional Chinese instruments, including dizi (transverse bamboo flute), erhu (two-stringed fiddle), pipa (pear-shaped lute), yangqin (hammered dulcimer), and percussion. The instrumentation and style are closely related to the instrumental genre of Jiangnan sizhu.

The well-known Chinese composition "Purple Bamboo Melody" (紫竹调; 紫竹調) has been adapted and used for huju.

== History ==
The Shanghai opera is rooted in the folksongs of the Huangpu River area. According to historical records from 1796, there was more than 200 years of cultural development from the original Huaguxi operas before the emergence of contemporary Shanghai opera.

During the rule of the Qianlong emperor of the Qing dynasty, Huaguxi was very popular in Shanghai. Influenced by Huaguxi and other forms of drama during the reign of the Guangxu emperor of Qing dynasty, these folksongs developed into Tanhuang (滩簧). In order to distinguish them from Sutan and Nibo Tanhuang, Shanghainese people called them "bentan" (本滩) or "shentan" (申滩). Performance of shentan began in Shanghai around the 1900s.

Before and after the revolution of 1911, shentan were performed in various venues across Shanghai. In 1914, Wenbin shao (邵文滨), Lanting Shi (施兰亭), and Shaolan Ding (丁少兰) organized "zhenxinji" to improve bentan. It was then renamed "shenqu" (申曲).

In 1941, Shanghai Huju She was founded in Shanghai. It was an ensemble that consisted of several opera performers. They renamed shenqu as Huju. During this period, Huju became a more concrete art form.

During the 1950s and 1960s, Huju adapted many modern plays. It adopted divisions of acts and recognized the role of the playwright and director at a much earlier time than other similar art forms. Red Lantern and Shajiabang—the most influential Jingju (Peking opera) plays among the eight model plays created during the Cultural Revolution—were both adapted from Huju plays.

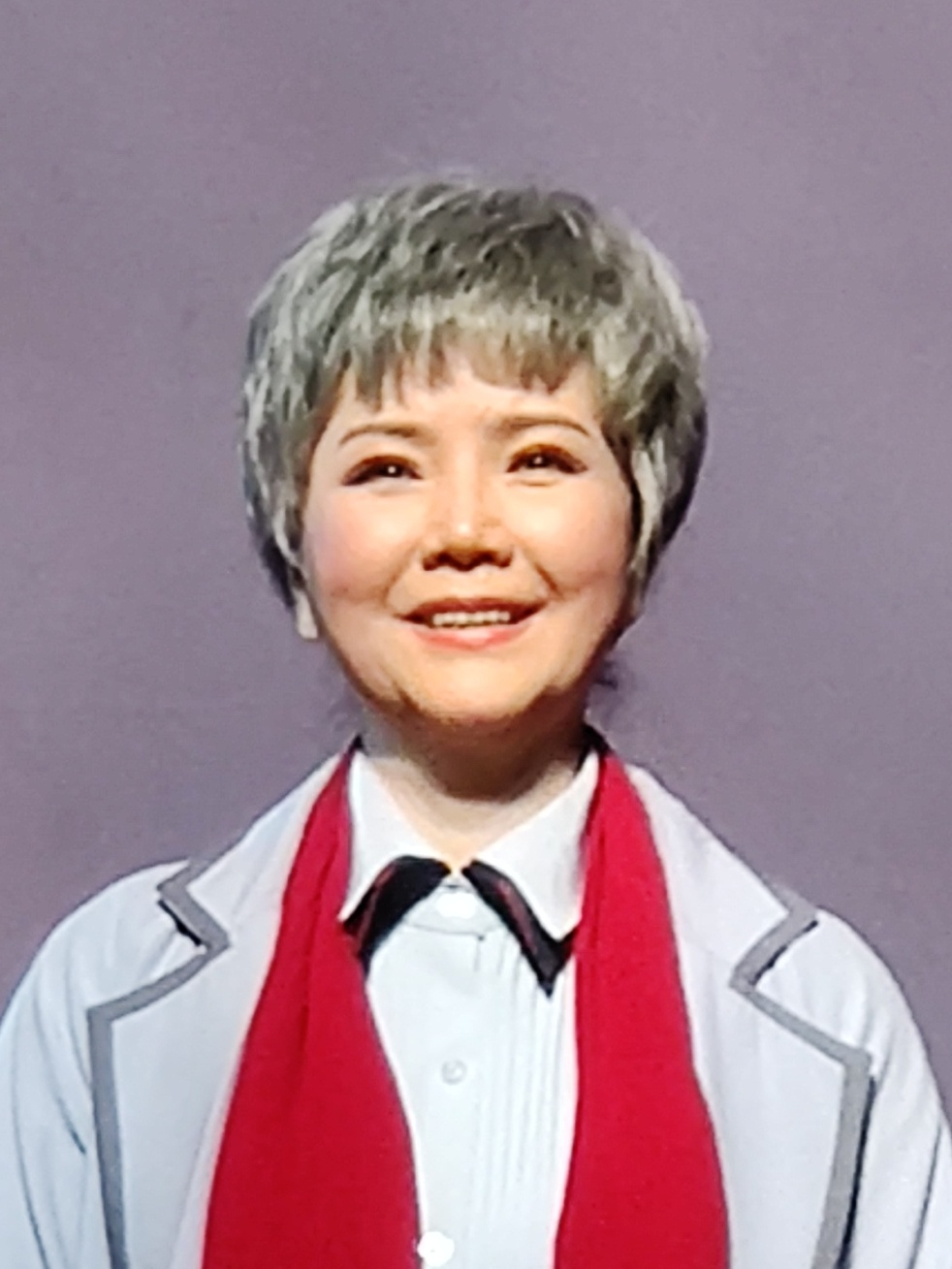
Shanghai opera legend Mao Shanyu in 2019

== Characteristics ==
Huju is performed in Shanghainese, a dialect that is considerably different from Mandarin. Translators are often available at the venues where these are performed.

The pieces tend to reflect certain aspects of real life because they derive from folk songs. Performances of the early Huju only needed two performers: one played a musical instrument and the other told contemporary stories. Huju also adopted many elements of movies and dramas in lighting, expression, and stage designs. Through Huju, people can gain a better knowledge of the life and history of Shanghai people.

== Future prospects ==
Like many other regional opera styles, Huju is in danger of disappearing. Wu dialect, which pertains to Shanghai, is not currently popular with local audiences. Performances of Huju are decreasing, and few young actors take up this art form when television and film have more popularity and influence. Meanwhile, lack of good Huju scripts is also a problem for the survival of Huju.

== See also ==
- Gu Yuezhen
- Yue opera, opera from the Shaoxing region of northeastern Zhejiang Province
