= Cornelius Jabez Hughes =

British photographer

Cornelius Jabez Hughes (20 July 1819 – 11 August 1884) was a British photographer, daguerreotypist, and writer. He was one of the best known portrait photographers in Victorian England, and today his photographs are included in a number of notable museum collections including the National Portrait Gallery in London and The J. Paul Getty Museum in Los Angeles.

== Background ==
Cornelius Jabez Hughes was born on 20 July 1819 in St. James Parish, Westminster, England to David and Elizabeth Hughes. His father was a tailor and he also worked as a tailor. He married Esther Wright in June 1843, and the couple had a son Alfred on 1 October 1843. Hughes spent most of his life living in London but also lived in Glasgow and towards the end of his life moved to the town of Ryde on the Isle of Wight. He died on 11 August 1884 in Ryde and is buried at Abney Park Cemetery in London.

== Career ==
=== Photography ===
After spending his early life as a tailor, Cornelius Jabez Hughes became interested in the new art of photography. Cornelius Jabez Hughes first worked as an assistant to English photographer John Jabez Edwin Mayall in London. After 1847 he moved to Glasgow, Scotland, where he opened his own successful studio and became a member of the Glasgow Photographic Society. In 1855 he returned to London and bought Mayall's former studio. Hughes later moved to the Isle of Wight and built the Regina House Studio in Ryde. His studio's location on the Isle of Wight was not far from Queen Victoria's Osborne House and the British royalty became frequent patrons.

Hughes is most recognized for his portrait photography and having captured a number of photos of royalty and famous people during his career, which included Queen Victoria, Princess Alexandra of Saxe-Altenburg, Prince Alemayehu, Princess Alice, Prime Minister Benjamin Disraeli, and Queen Victoria's favorite Scottish attendant John Brown. He also photographed the exterior and interior of Osborne House. His photos are held by a number of prominent collections including by the National Portrait Gallery in London, The J. Getty Museum in Los Angeles, and the Royal Collection.

=== Writing and lecturing ===
Hughes wrote a number of guides and articles on photography, including a well-received practical photography guide. Hughes also gave a number of lectures on a number of scientific subjects.
