= Gu Yuezhen =

Gu Yuezhen (1921–1970) was a Chinese opera singer who performed in the huju style with the Shanghai Opera Troupe. In 1949, she established her own Nuli Shanghai Opera Troupe, gaining considerable success in 1953 with a reworked presentation of Zhao Yiman. Facing strong criticism during the Cultural Revolution, she committed suicide in January 1970 but was later rehabilitated.

== Biography ==
Abandoned at birth in Shanghai on 15 November 1921, she was found by a bamboo craftsman who raised her in his poverty-stricken family home. Initially given the name Jinmei, as a child she helped to support the family by singing. When she was 14, she was trained by the artist Gu Quansheng in shenqu singing, an older form of huju. He gave her the name Gu Yuezhen in memory of the celebrated shenqu artist Xiao Yuezhen. A keen student, a year later she was able to join a troupe and perform on stage, singing popular songs. After joining the Shijia Troupe and the Yang Jingwen Troupe, she finally became a member of the Shanghai Opera Troupe. She was particularly successful with the sad, plaintive song "Lenggong yuan" (Resentment in the Cold Palace).

After retiring from the stage while suffering from pulmonary tuberculosis in the late 1940s, she returned in 1949 to establish a new troupe known as the Nuli Shanghai Opera Troupe. Her first productions experienced difficulties but in 1953, she staged the highly successful Zhao Yiman telling the story of the pro-Chinese Japanese heroine Zhao Yiman in a fully revised style. She continued to perform herself until one of her lungs had to be removed when her tuberculosis returned. As a result, she concentrated on directing.

During the Cultural Revolution, she was denounced for her high-ranking positions as head of the Nuli Troupe, as director of the Shanghai branch of the Chinese Theatre Association and as a member of the Shanghai Municipal Council. She committed suicide by jumping from a tall building. Her body was found in the street in the middle of the night on 12 January 1970.

Rehabilitated in September 1978, she is now remembered as an important contributor to Shanghai Opera.
