= Sarah Robinson (activist) =

British temperance activist (1834–1921)

- Born: 1 August 1834; Peckham, Surrey
- Died: 26 November 1921 (aged 87); Burley, Hampshire
- Occupation: Temperance activist

Sarah Robinson (1 August 1834 – 26 November 1921) was a British temperance activist. She set up the Aldershot Mission Institute in 1863 to cater to the town's garrison. Robinson spent much of the 1860s travelling around British Army camps and garrisons distributing bibles, holding prayer meetings and providing games and reading material to the soldiers. She established the Portsmouth Soldiers' Institute in 1874 to cater for soldiers travelling through the port. For her efforts she was nicknamed the "Soldier's Friend" and received some recognition from the government. Robinson suffered from a spinal problem that limited her mobility in later life, though she continued to travel widely to raise funds for her missions. She retired to Burley, Hampshire and wrote a number of books before her death.

== Early life ==
Sarah Robinson was born on 1 August 1834 at Peckham, Surrey. She was the fourth child (out of six) of Rebecca and John James Robinson – who farmed a 150-acre estate near Lewes, Sussex. Sarah attended a ladies' academy in Brighton from 1844 to 1848 but was withdrawn following an illness and the death of Rebecca. As a child she was described as "delicate in health, reserved, sensitive and timid". She was, however, fascinated with the military, having played toy soldiers with her brothers and read widely on military heroes. Despite being baptised in the Grove Independent Chapel in Camberwell and her father being a strict Calvinist Robinson's faith was more fluid, affiliating to the Church of England from 1851 and to Presbyterianism from 1866.

== Aldershot temperance movement ==
In 1858 the Robinson family moved to Guildford where Robinson worked as a Sunday school singing teacher and lecturer on the bible. She also visited the homes of the sick and poor. Robinson was inspired by reading Julia Wightman's 1860 book Haste to the Rescue, Sarah began visiting the nearby Aldershot Garrison to promote the temperance movement. She founded the Aldershot Mission Institute in 1863 with Louisa Daniell, an army officer's widow, to provide an alcohol-free place for entertaining servicemen. The Institute was initially opposed by the Royal Army Chaplains' Department (RAChD) and the Chaplain-General of the Forces George Gleig forbade one Aldershot chaplain from attending the opening event.

Together with Agnes Weston, who led the movement in the navy, she was instructed by the National Temperance League to promote a series of initiatives in the armed forces and campaigned for better accommodation, entertainment and education facilities for the men. From 1865 to 1873 she travelled widely across garrisons in England, including nine weeks spent camping in Dartmoor observing units on manoeuvres where she set up two marquees selling cheap food and non-alcoholic drinks. She also distributed bibles, held prayer meetings and provided games, newspapers and books to the troops. Robinson also visited brothels with a view to improving the health of the sex workers and their clients.

== Portsmouth Institute ==
Robinson founded the Portsmouth Soldiers' Institute in a converted public house in 1874 to house troops and their families awaiting ships abroad or newly arrived from overseas service. Robinson's efforts here were again opposed by the RAChD which was quite high church and ritualist in this period. The town's senior chaplain particularly disagreed with Robinson's bible classes. As a result, the army chaplains were not invited to meetings at the institute and no attempt was made to encourage them to visit. The Institute was later expanded to provide accommodation for officers and additional educational and entertainment facilities despite opposition from the town (which she referred to as "Satan's very seat").

Robinson's success in the army led her to become known as the "Soldier's Friend" and helped bring about an increase in the army's concern for the welfare of the troops. She also received recognition by the government, being allowed to use army facilities and listed in a parliamentary blue book as a lecturer in military education. One of her canteens was visited by the secretary of state for war and in 1874 the Portsmouth Institute was inspected by Prince George, Duke of Cambridge – the commander-in-chief of the army. Robinson was also mentioned by Jeannie Chappell in her 1900 book Noble Work by Noble Women. Robinson herself published several works on temperance including an essay in Hatford Battersby's 1868 work Temperance Reformation, the 1876 book Christianity and Teetotalism and the autobiographical A Life Record of 1898.

== Later life ==
In the early 1880s Robinson founded the Soldier's Institute in Alexandria, British Egypt and had also expanded the remit of the Portsmouth Institute to the general working classes. She established night schools, a coffee shop and a public laundry in the town. Robinson spent the years of 1889–1891 travelling across the UK to raise money for her institute which was in debt. Suffering from a chronic spinal problem, and long warned by doctors in England that she would soon become permanently immobile, she used a steel apparatus that lessened the weight from the spine. Also, she travelled more than 3,000 miles in a specially constructed coach; ultimately, despite these measures, she was forced to retire for health reasons to Burley, Hampshire, though she remained superintendent of the Institute. She published The Soldiers Friend: A Pioneer's Record in 1913 and her last autobiography My Book: a Personal Narrative in 1914. Robinson died at home on 26 November 1921; her wealth at probate was £1207 14s 10d and she was cremated in Woking. Robinson has been described as the "most widely known female reformer in the field of rescue work among soldiers".
