= Lynching of Jesse Washington =

1916 killing in Waco, Texas, U.S.

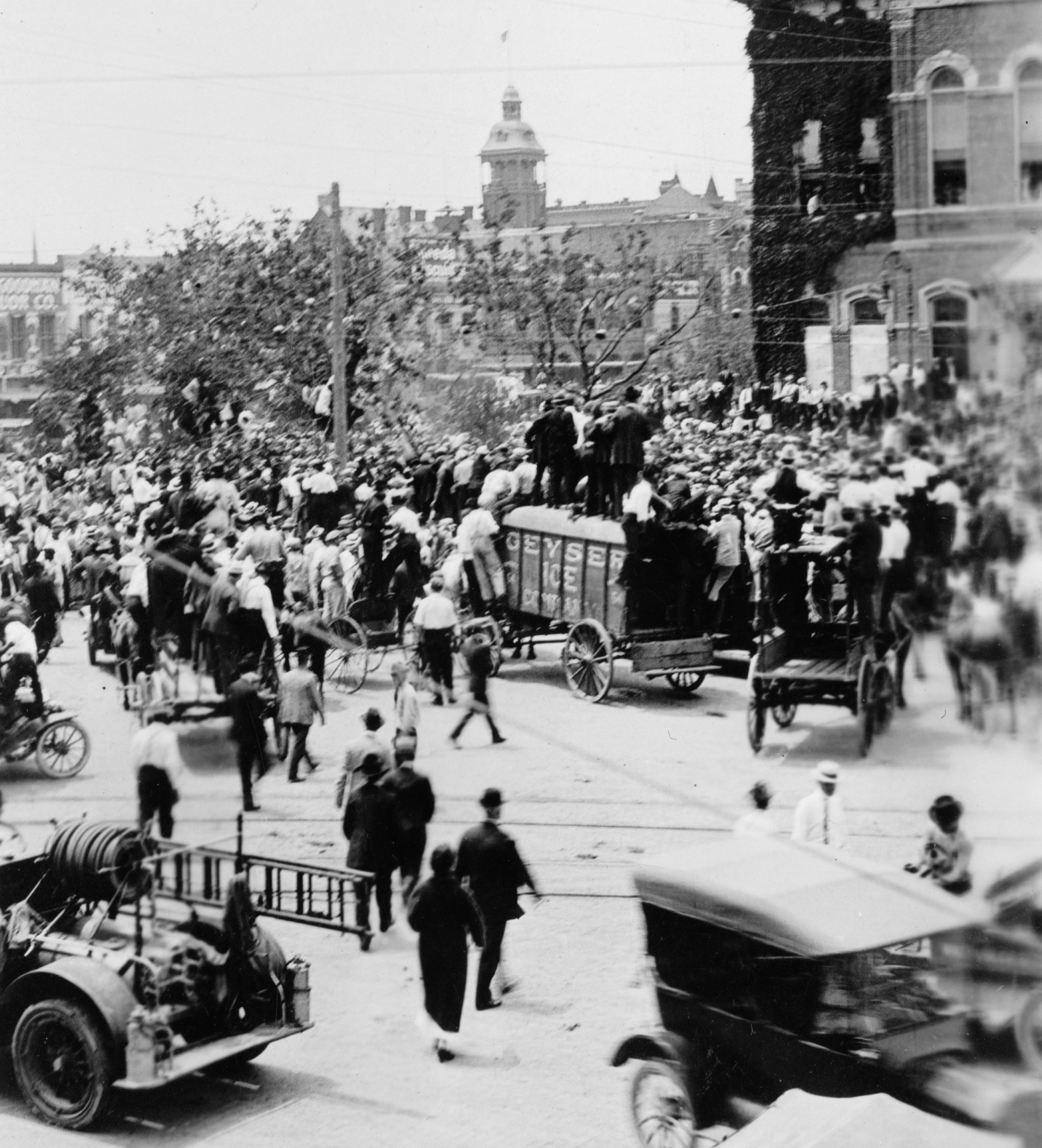
- The crowd watching the lynching of Washington
- Location: 31°33′30″N 97°07′47″W; Waco, Texas, U.S.
- Date: May 15, 1916

Jesse Washington was a 17-year-old African American farmhand who was lynched in the county seat of Waco, Texas, on May 15, 1916, in what became a well-known example of lynching known as the "Waco Horror". Washington was accused of raping and murdering Lucy Fryer, the wife of his white employer in rural Robinson, Texas. After being found guilty and sentenced to death, he was chained by his neck and dragged out of the county court by observers. Washington was then paraded through the street, all while being stabbed and beaten, before being held down and castrated. He was then lynched in front of Waco's city hall.

Over 10,000 spectators, including city officials and police, gathered to watch the attack. There was a celebratory atmosphere among the people at the spectacle of the murder, and many children attended during their lunch hour. Members of the mob cut off Washington's fingers and hung him over a bonfire after saturating him with coal oil. Washington was repeatedly lowered and raised over the fire for about two hours. After the fire was extinguished, his charred torso was dragged through the town. A professional photographer took pictures as the event unfolded, providing rare imagery of a lynching in progress. The pictures were printed and sold as postcards in Waco. Although the lynching was supported by many Waco residents, it was condemned by newspapers around the United States.

The National Association for the Advancement of Colored People (NAACP) hired Elisabeth Freeman to investigate; she conducted a detailed probe in Waco, despite the reluctance of many residents to speak about the event. Freeman concluded that white residents were generally supportive of Washington's lynching. She also concluded that Washington had actually murdered Fryer, albeit the accusations that he had raped her were false. After receiving Freeman's report on the lynching, NAACP co-founder and editor W. E. B. Du Bois published an in-depth report featuring photographs of Washington's charred body in The Crisis, and the NAACP featured his death in their anti-lynching campaign.

Historians have noted that Washington's death helped alter the way lynching was viewed. The widespread negative publicity helped curb public support for the practice. In the 1990s and 2000s, some Waco residents lobbied for a monument to Washington's lynching, but this idea failed to garner wide support in the city. On the centennial of the event in May 2016, the mayor of Waco held a formal ceremony to apologize to Washington's relatives and the African American community. A historical marker has been installed to memorialize the lynching.

== Background ==
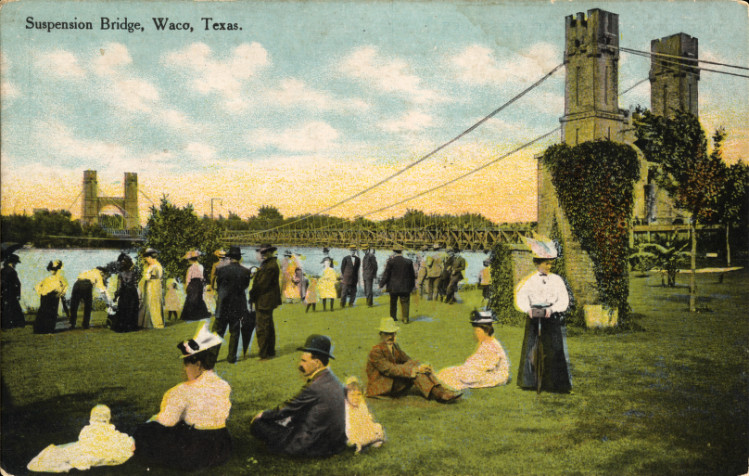
A 1911 postcard of a group of Waco residents on the river bank, alluding to George Seurat's La Grande Jatte, reflecting the city's desire to present itself as an idyllic locale

In the late 19th and early 20th centuries, thousands of lynchings were committed primarily in the Southern United States. Between 1890 and 1920, about 3,000 African Americans who were alleged perpetrators of crimes were killed by lynch mobs. They were conducted outside the legal system: suspects were taken from jail and courtrooms or killed before arrest. Supporters of lynching justified the practice as a way to assert dominance over African Americans, to whom they attributed a criminal nature. Lynching also provided a sense of white solidarity in a culture with changing demographics and power structures. Although lynching was tolerated by much of southern society, opponents of the practice emerged, including some religious leaders and the nascent National Association for the Advancement of Colored People (NAACP).

Waco, Texas, was a prosperous city with a population of more than 30,000 in 1916. After it became associated with crime in the 19th century, community leaders sought to change its reputation, sending delegations across the U.S. to promote it as an idyllic locale. By the 1910s, Waco's economy had become strong and the city had gained a pious reputation. A black middle class had emerged in the area, along with two black colleges. In the mid-1910s, blacks constituted about twenty percent of the Waco population. In her 2006 study of lynching, journalist Patricia Bernstein describes the city as then having a "thin veneer" of peace and respectability. Racial tension was present in the city: local newspapers often emphasized crimes committed by African Americans, and Sank Majors, a black man, was lynched and hanged from a bridge near downtown Waco in 1905. A small number of anti-lynching activists lived in the area, including the president of Waco's Baylor University. In 1916, several factors led to an increase in local racism, including the screening of The Birth of a Nation, a movie that glorified the Ku Klux Klan, and the sale of photographs of a recently lynched black man in Temple, Texas.

== Murder and arrest ==
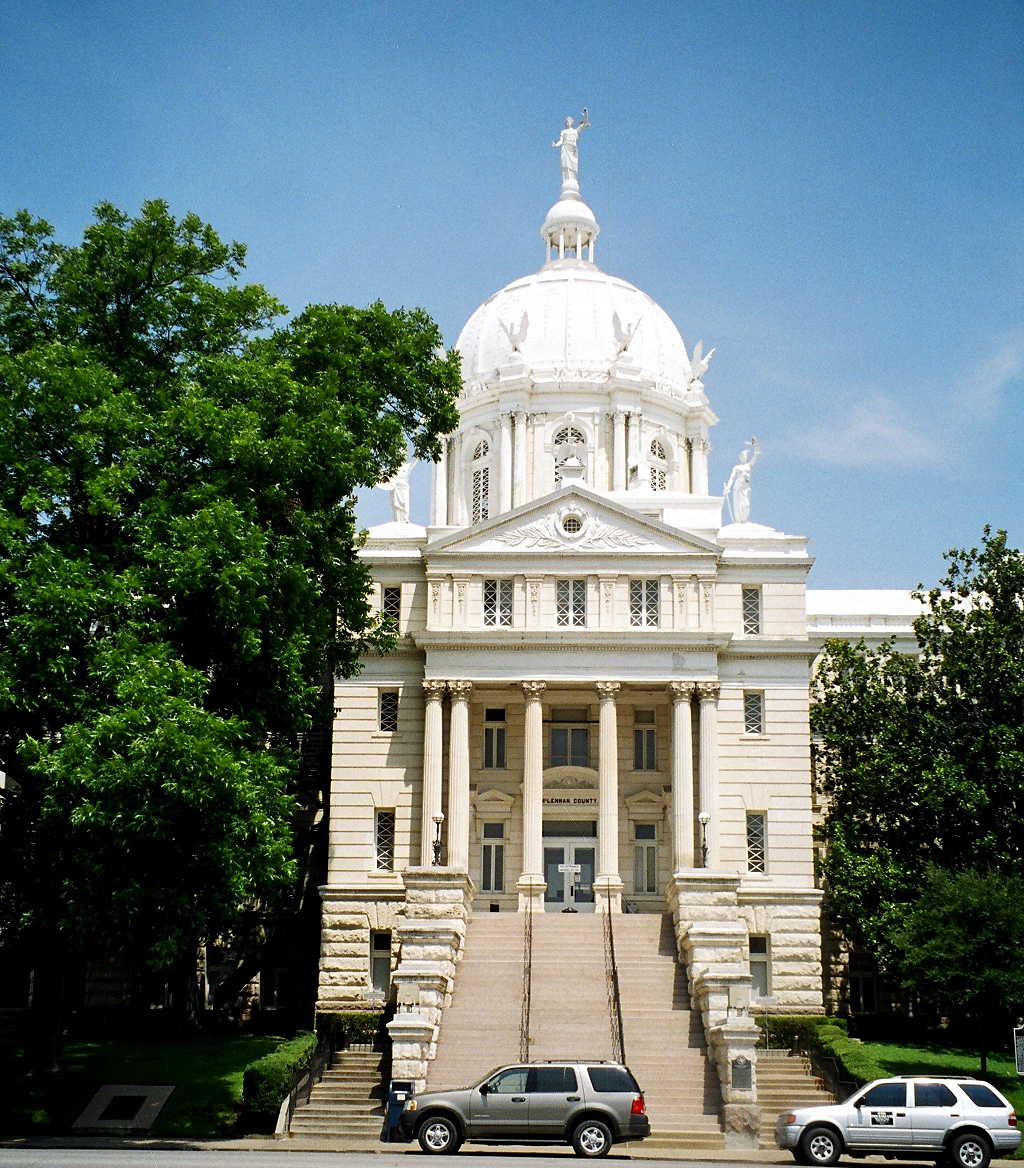
McLennan County courthouse in 2006

In Robinson, Texas, Lucy Fryer was murdered while alone at her house on May 8, 1916. She was found clubbed to death, sprawled across the doorway of the farm's seed shed. It was a grisly scene that included signs of sexual assault. Officials determined a blunt instrument was used as the murder weapon. She and her husband George were English immigrants and had become well respected in the rural community where they operated a farm. News of the death quickly reached the McLennan County Sheriff, Samuel Fleming, who immediately investigated with a team of law enforcement officers, a group of local men, and a doctor. The doctor determined that Fryer had been killed by blunt-force trauma to the head. The local men suspected that Jesse Washington, a seventeen-year-old black youth who had worked on the Fryers' farm for five months, was responsible. One man said that he had seen Washington near the Fryer house a few minutes before Lucy's body was discovered.

That night, sheriff's deputies traveled to Washington's home, finding him in front of the house wearing blood-stained overalls. He said the stains were from a nosebleed. Jesse, his brother William, and their parents were taken to nearby Waco to be questioned by the county sheriff's department; although Jesse's parents and brother were released after a short time, he was held for further interrogation without an attorney or his parents present. His questioners in Waco reported that he denied complicity in Fryer's death, but offered contradictory details about his actions. Rumors spread after Washington's arrest that the youth had been in an altercation with a white man a few days before the murder.

On May 9, Sheriff Fleming took Washington to neighboring Hill County to prevent vigilante action. The Hill County sheriff, Fred Long, questioned Washington with Fleming. Washington eventually told them he had killed Fryer following an argument about her mules and described the murder weapon and its location. Long then brought Washington to Dallas, while Fleming returned to Robinson. Fleming soon reported that he found a bloody hammer where Washington had indicated. In Dallas, Washington dictated and signed a statement that described the rape and murder of Fryer; the confession was published the next day in Waco newspapers. Newspapers sensationalized the murder, describing Fryer's attempts to resist Washington's attack, but the doctor who had examined her body concluded that she was killed before any assault. A lynch mob assembled in Waco that night to search the local jail, but dispersed after failing to find Washington. A local paper praised their effort. That night, a small, private funeral and burial were held for Lucy Fryer.

A grand jury was assembled on May 11 in McLennan County and quickly returned an indictment against Washington; the trial was scheduled for May 15. The Times-Herald of Waco published a notice on May 12 requesting that residents let the justice system determine Washington's fate. Sheriff Fleming traveled to Robinson on May 13 to ask residents to remain calm; his address was well received. Washington was assigned several inexperienced lawyers. His lawyers prepared no defense and noted that he appeared placid in the days before the trial.

== Trial and lynching ==
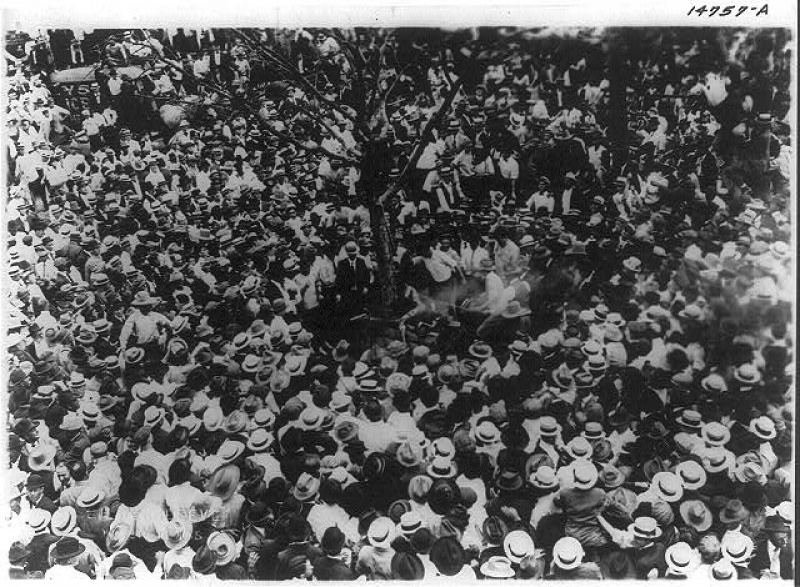
The crowd preparing to lynch Washington

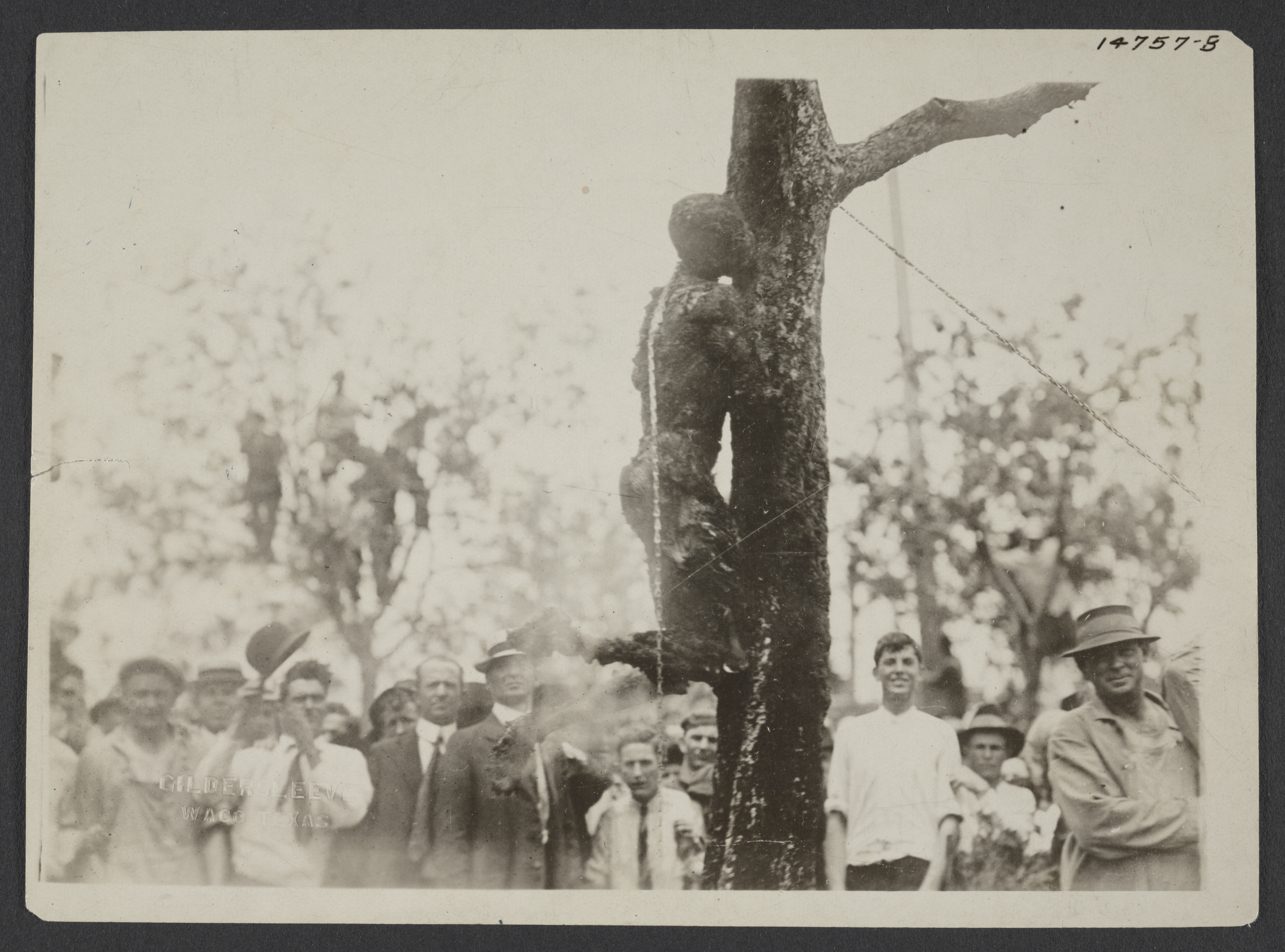
The crowd looking at the burned body of Washington

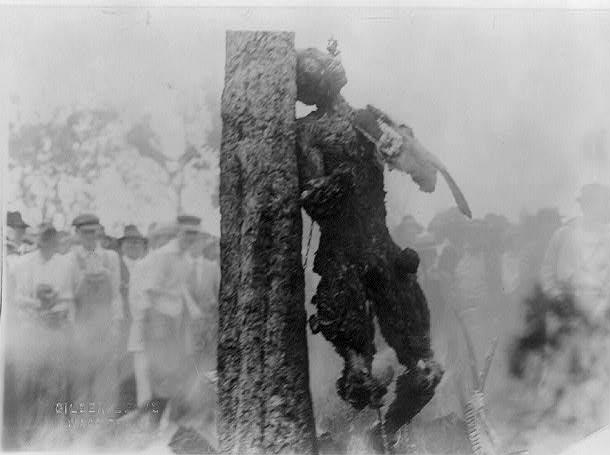
Washington's body hanging

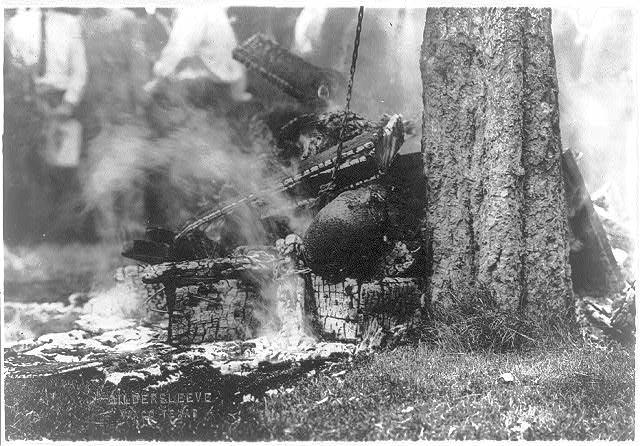
Charred corpse of Washington among the ashes

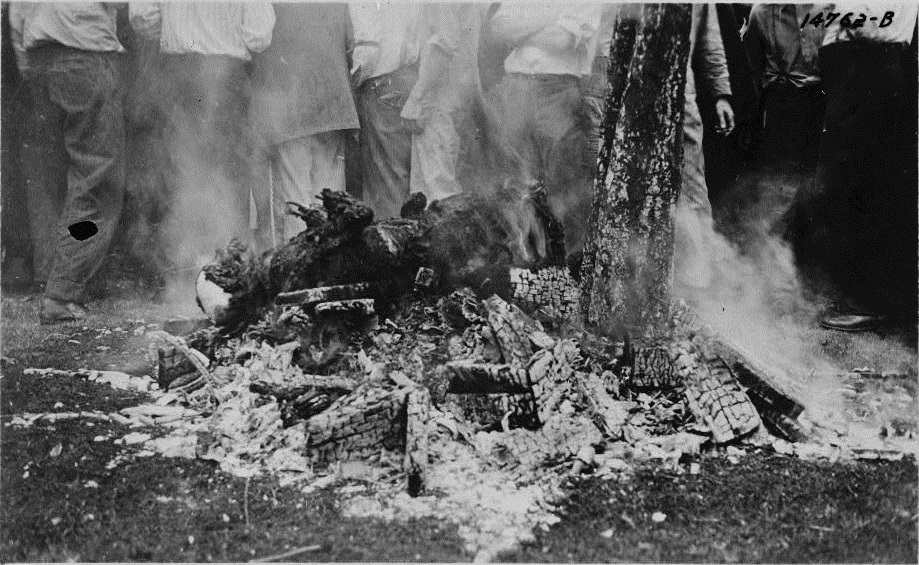
Charred corpse of Washington among the ashes

On the morning of May 15, Waco's courthouse quickly filled to capacity in anticipation of the trial: the crowd almost prevented some jurors from entering. Observers also filled the sidewalks around the courthouse; more than two thousand spectators were present. Attendees were almost entirely white, but a few quiet members of Waco's black community were present. As Washington was led into the courtroom, one audience member pointed a gun at him but was quickly overpowered. As the trial commenced, Judge Richard Irby Munroe attempted to keep order, insisting that the audience remain silent. Jury selection proceeded quickly: the defense did not challenge any selections of the prosecution. Judge Munroe asked Washington for a plea and explained the potential sentences. Washington muttered a response, possibly "yes", interpreted by the court as a guilty plea.

The prosecution described the charges, and the court heard testimony from law enforcement officers and the doctor who examined Fryer's body. The doctor discussed how Fryer died but did not mention rape. The prosecution rested, and Washington's attorney asked him whether he had committed the offense. Washington replied, "That's what I done" and quietly apologized. The lead prosecutor addressed the courtroom and declared that the trial had been conducted fairly, prompting an ovation from the crowd. The jury was sent to deliberate.

After four minutes of deliberation, the jury's foreman announced a guilty verdict and a sentence of death. The trial lasted about one hour. Court officers approached Washington to escort him away but were pushed aside by a surge of spectators, who seized Washington and dragged him outside. Washington initially fought back, biting one man, but was soon beaten. A chain was placed around his neck, and he was dragged toward city hall by a growing mob; on the way downtown, he was stripped, stabbed, and repeatedly beaten with blunt objects. By the time he was taken to city hall, a group had prepared wood for a bonfire next to a tree in front of the building. Washington, semiconscious and covered in blood, was doused with oil, hanged from the tree by a chain, and lowered to the ground. Members of the crowd cut off his fingers, toes, and genitals. The fire was lit and Washington was repeatedly raised and lowered into the flames until he burned to death. German scholar Manfred Berg posits that the executioners attempted to keep him alive to increase his suffering. Washington attempted to climb the chain but was unable to do so without fingers. The fire was extinguished after two hours, allowing bystanders to collect souvenirs from the site of the lynching, including Washington's bones and links of the chain. One attendee kept part of Washington's genitalia; a group of children snapped the teeth out of Washington's head to sell as souvenirs. By the time the fire was extinguished, parts of Washington's arms and legs had been burned off, his torso and head were charred and his cranium was exposed. His body was removed from the tree and dragged behind a horse throughout the town. Washington's remains were transported to Robinson, where they were publicly displayed until a constable obtained the body late in the day and buried it.

The spectacle of the lynching drew a large crowd estimated at 10,000 to 15,000 at its peak, including the mayor John Dollins and the chief of police Guy McNamara, although lynching was illegal in Texas. Sheriff Fleming told his deputies not to try to stop the lynching, and no one was arrested after the event. Bernstein speculates that Fleming may have wanted to be seen as dealing harshly with crime to help his candidacy for re-election that year. Mayor John Dollins may have also encouraged the mob for political benefit.

Residents had telephoned acquaintances to spread the word of the lynching, allowing spectators to gather more quickly and in greater numbers than before the advent of telephones. Local media reported that "shouts of delight" were heard as Washington burned, although they noted that some attendees disapproved. The Waco Semi-Weekly Tribune maintained that several black Waco residents attended, a claim historian Grace Hale of the University of Virginia considers dubious. Waco residents, who likely had no connection with the rural Fryer family, constituted most of the crowd. Some people from nearby rural communities traveled to the city before the trial to witness the events. As the lynching occurred at midday, children from local schools walked downtown to observe, some climbing into trees for a better view. Many parents approved of their children's attendance, hoping that the lynching would reinforce a belief in white supremacy. Some Texans saw participation in a lynching as a rite of passage for young white men.

== Aftermath ==
Fred Gildersleeve, a Waco-based professional photographer, arrived at city hall shortly before the lynching, possibly at the mayor's request, and photographed the event. His photographs provide rare depictions of a lynching in progress, rather than typical lynching photography, which shows only dead victims. Gildersleeve's photographs include views of the crowd shot from a building and close images of Washington's body; some may have been taken by an assistant. Gildersleeve produced postcards featuring images of adolescents, some as young as twelve, gathered around Washington's body. The individuals in the photographs did not attempt to hide their identities. Berg believes that their willingness to be photographed indicates that they knew that no one would be prosecuted for Washington's death. Although some Waco residents sent the cards to out-of-town relatives, several prominent local citizens persuaded Gildersleeve to stop selling them, fearing that the images would damage the town's reputation.

In the days after the lynching, newspapers fiercely condemned the event. Within a week, news of the lynching was published as far away as London. A New York Times editorial opined that, "in no other land even pretending to be civilized could a man be burned to death in the streets of a considerable city amid the savage exultation of its inhabitants". In the New York Age, James Weldon Johnson described the members of the lynch mob as "lower than any other people who at present inhabit the earth". Although many southern newspapers had previously defended lynching as a defense of civilized society, after Washington's death, they avoided casting the practice in such terms. The Montgomery Advertiser wrote that, "no savage was ever more cruel ... than the men who participated in this horrible, almost unbelievable episode". In Texas, the Houston Chronicle and the Austin American criticized the lynch mob, but spoke highly of Waco. The Morning News of Dallas reported the story, but did not publish an accompanying editorial. In Waco, the Times-Herald refrained from editorializing about the lynching. The Waco Morning News briefly noted disapproval of the lynching, focusing criticism on papers they felt had attacked the city unfairly. They cast the condemnatory editorials in the aftermath of the lynching as "Holier than thou" remarks. A writer for the Waco Semi-Weekly Tribune defended the lynching, stating that Washington deserved to die and that blacks should view Washington's death as a warning against crime. The paper later carried an editorial from the Houston Post condemning the lynching, characterizing the column as part of an attack on the city.

Some residents condemned the lynching, including ministers and leaders of Baylor University. The judge who presided over Washington's trial later stated that members of the lynch mob were "murderers"; the jury's foreman told the NAACP that he disapproved of their actions. Some who witnessed the lynching recorded persistent nightmares and psychological trauma. A few citizens contemplated staging a protest against the lynching but declined to do so owing to concerns about reprisals or the appearance of hypocrisy. After the lynching, town officials maintained that it was attended by a small group of malcontents. Although their claim is contradicted by photographic evidence, several histories of Waco have repeated this assertion. There were no negative repercussions for Mayor Dollins or Police Chief Guy McNamara; although they did not attempt to stop the mob, they remained well respected in Waco. As was common with such attacks, no one was prosecuted for the lynching.

Although leaders of Waco's black community gave public condolences to the Fryer family, they complained about Washington's lynching only in private. One exception was the Paul Quinn Weekly newspaper, of Texas's Paul Quinn College, a black college. It published several articles that criticized the lynch mob and city leadership. In one article, the author proclaimed that Jesse Washington was innocent and George Fryer guilty. A. T. Smith, the paper's editor, was subsequently convicted of libel. When George Fryer sued the college for libeling him as a murderer, some Robinson residents interpreted his very umbrage as a sign that he had played a part in his wife's death. Bernstein states that it is "highly unlikely" that George Fryer played a role in Lucy's murder but notes that there is the "shadow of a possibility" that he bore some guilt.

On May 11, 1953, an F5 tornado tore through downtown Waco, killing 114 people and injuring 593 others. Some people in the local African American community saw the tornado as divine retribution for the lynching of Jesse Washington over thirty years prior.

== NAACP investigation and campaign ==
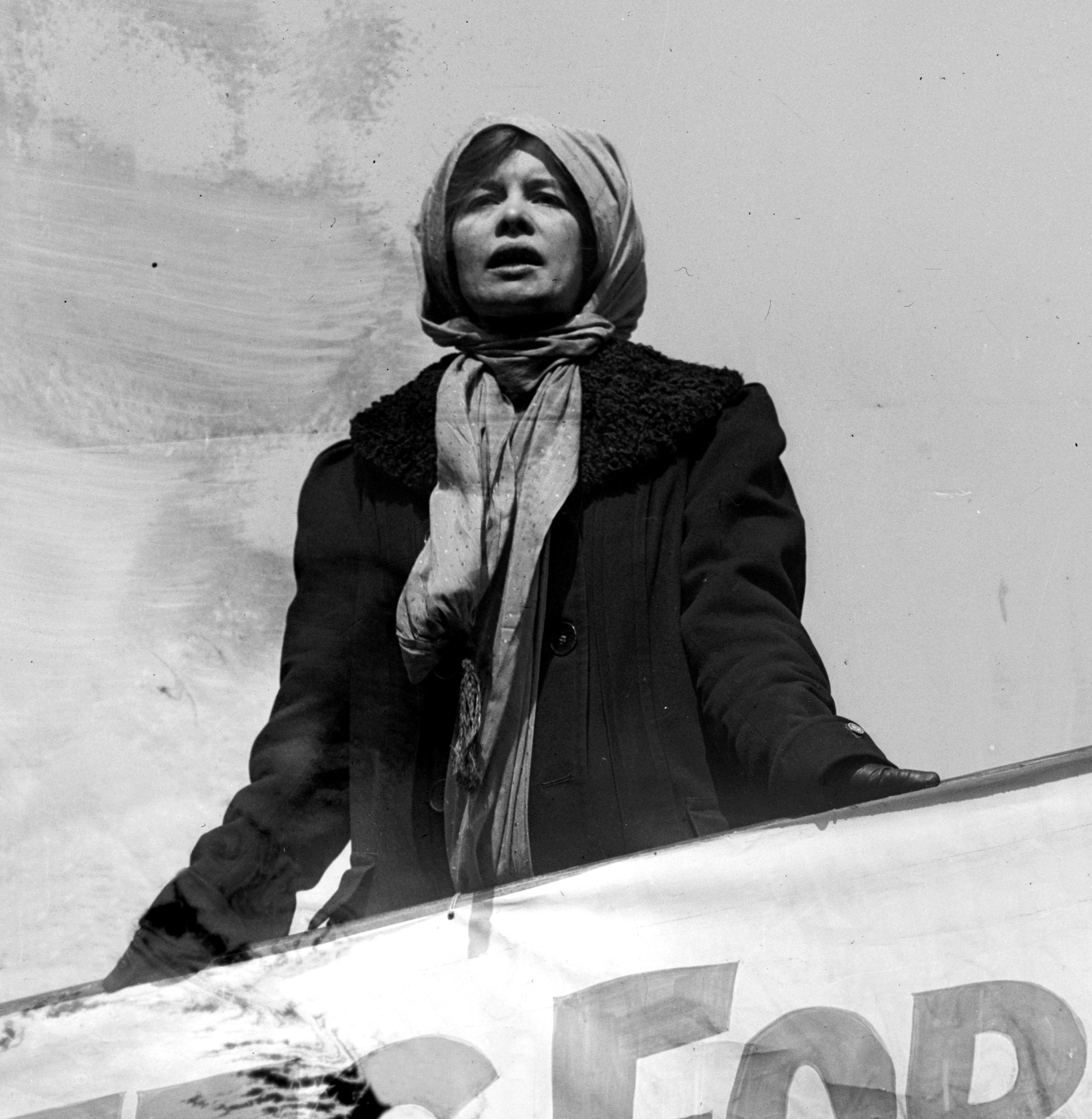
Elisabeth Freeman in 1913

The NAACP hired Elisabeth Freeman, a women's suffrage activist based in New York City, to investigate the lynching. She had traveled to Texas in late 1915 or early 1916 to help organize the suffrage movement and was already in Dallas for a statewide convention in early May. Freeman began her assignment in Waco soon after the lynching, posing as a journalist and attempting to interview people about the events. She found that most residents were reluctant to discuss the event. She spoke with town officials and obtained pictures of the lynching from Gildersleeve, who was initially reluctant to provide them. Although she feared for her safety, she enjoyed the challenge of the investigation. When speaking with city leaders, Freeman convinced them that she planned to defend Waco against criticism when she returned to the North. Some journalists soon grew suspicious of her and warned residents not to talk to outsiders. Local African Americans, however, gave her a warm reception.

Freeman interviewed both Sheriff Fleming and the judge who presided over the trial; each said that he did not deserve blame for the lynching. A schoolteacher who had known Washington told Freeman that the young man was illiterate and that all attempts to teach him to read had been futile. Freeman concluded that white residents were generally supportive of Washington's lynching after his conviction, although many were upset that he had been mutilated. She determined that the mob that took him from the courtroom was led by a bricklayer, a saloonkeeper, and several employees of an ice company. The NAACP did not publicly identify them. Freeman concluded that Washington killed Fryer, and suggested he had resented her domineering attitude towards him.

W. E. B. Du Bois had been incensed by news of the brutal attack, saying "any talk of the triumph of Christianity, or the spread of human culture, is idle twaddle as long as the Waco lynching is possible in the United States". After receiving Freeman's report, he placed a photograph of Washington's body on the cover of The Crisis, the NAACP's newsletter, in a special issue that discussed the event. The issue was titled "The Waco Horror" and was published as an eight-page supplement to the July edition. Du Bois popularized "Waco Horror" as a name for Washington's lynching; the Houston Chronicle and the New York Times had previously used the word "horror" to describe the event. In 1916, The Crisis had a circulation of about 30,000, three times the size of the NAACP's membership.

Although The Crisis had campaigned against lynching in the past, this publication was their first to depict images of an attack. The NAACP's board was initially hesitant to publish such graphic content, but Du Bois insisted on doing so, arguing that uncensored coverage would push white Americans to support change. The issue included accounts of the lynching that Freeman had obtained from Waco residents. Du Bois wrote The Crisis's article on the lynching; he edited and organized Freeman's report for publication, but did not credit her in the issue. Du Bois's article concluded with a call to support the anti-lynching movement. The NAACP distributed the report to hundreds of newspapers and politicians, a campaign that led to wide condemnation of the lynching. Many white observers were disturbed by photos of the southerners who celebrated the lynching. The Crisis included more images of lynchings in subsequent issues. Washington's death received continued discussion in The Crisis. Oswald Garrison Villard wrote in a later edition of the paper that "the crime at Waco is a challenge to our American civilization".

Other black newspapers also carried significant coverage of the lynching, as did liberal monthly magazines such as The New Republic and The Nation. Freeman traveled around the U.S. to speak to audiences about her investigation, maintaining that a shift in public opinion could accomplish more than legislative actions. Although there were other lynchings as brutal as Washington's, the availability of photographs and the setting of his death made it a cause célèbre. Leaders of the NAACP hoped to launch a legal battle against those responsible for Washington's death, but abandoned the plan owing to the projected cost.

The NAACP had struggled financially around that time. Their anti-lynching campaign helped them raise funds, but they scaled back the campaign as the U.S. entered World War I. NAACP president Joel Elias Spingarn later said that the group's campaign placed "lynching into the public mind as something like a national problem". Bernstein describes this anti-lynching campaign as the "barest beginnings of a battle that would last many years".

The number of lynchings in the U.S. increased in the late 1910s, particularly in the postwar period. In addition, in the summer and fall of 1919 called Red Summer, racial riots of whites against blacks broke out in numerous large cities, including in the Northeast and Midwest, due in part to tensions related to competition for jobs and housing in the postwar period as veterans struggled to re-enter society. Particularly in Chicago and Washington, DC, blacks fought back fiercely in the riots but suffered the most casualties and property losses. They believed their war service should have earned them better treatment as citizens.

More lynchings took place in Waco in the 1920s, partially owing to the resurgence of the Ku Klux Klan. By the late 1920s, however, Waco authorities had begun to protect blacks from lynching, as in the case of Roy Mitchell. Authorities feared that negative publicity generated by lynchings—such as the NAACP's campaign following Washington's death—would hinder their efforts to attract business investors. The NAACP fought to portray lynching as a savage, barbaric practice, an idea that eventually gained traction in the public mind. Bernstein credits the group's efforts with helping to end "the worst public atrocities of the racist system" in the Waco region.

== Analysis and legacy ==
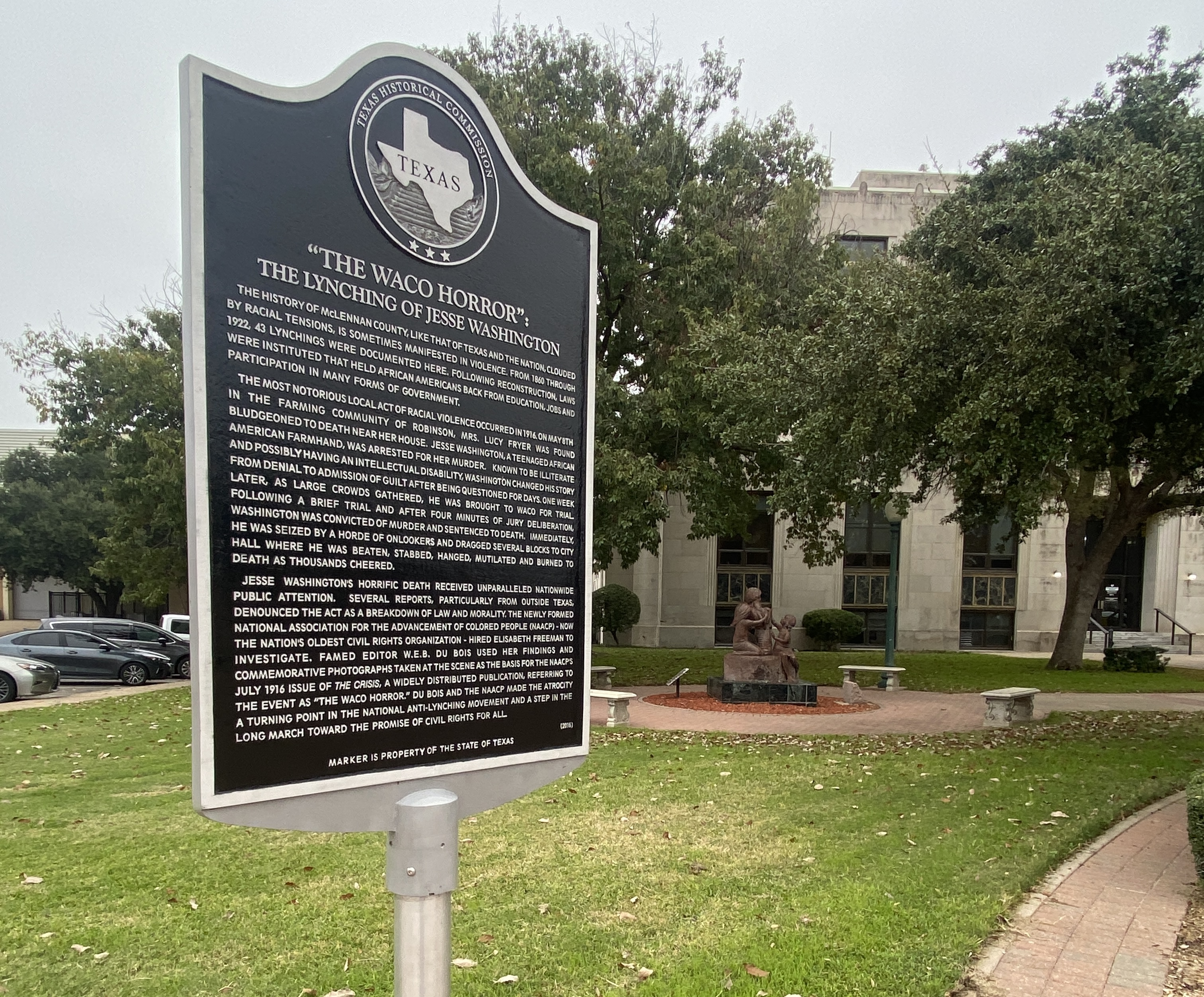
Historical marker with Waco City Hall and the "Friendship is for all Seasons" sculpture in background

In 2011, Manfred Berg concluded that Washington probably murdered Fryer but doubted that he raped her. The same year, Julie Armstrong of the University of South Florida argued that Washington was possibly innocent of both charges. In her 2006 book, Patricia Bernstein noted that Washington's motives have never been established clearly, although he did confess to having a dispute about mules with Fryer and there was a witness who alleged to have seen a dispute, as noted previously. She also states that his confession could have been coerced and that there is evidence he had limited intellectual capacity. She suggests that the murder weapon—perhaps the strongest evidence against him—could have been planted by authorities.

Bernstein states that Washington's lynching was a unique event because of its scale and location; not only did it occur in a larger city with a reputation for progressiveness, but it was attended by 10,000 spectators who were excited by the brutal torture. Similar acts of mob violence typically occurred in smaller towns with fewer spectators. William Carrigan of Rowan University argues that the culture of central Texas had glorified retributive mob violence for decades before Washington's lynching, maintaining that this culture of violence explains how such a brutal attack could be publicly celebrated. Hale posits that Washington's death signaled a transition in the practice of lynching, demonstrating its acceptance in modernized, 20th-century cities. She notes that Washington's lynching illustrates how technological innovations, such as telephones and inexpensive photographs, could empower lynch mobs but also increase society's condemnation of their actions.

In their 2004 study of lynching, Peter Ehrenhaus and A. Susan Owen compare the lynching to a blood sacrifice, arguing Waco residents felt a sense of collective righteousness after Washington's death, as they saw him as the presence of evil in the community. Bernstein compares the public brutality of the lynch mob to the medieval English practice of hanging, drawing, and quartering people convicted of high treason.

Amy Louise Wood of Illinois State University writes that the event was "a defining moment in the history of lynching", arguing that with Washington's death, "lynching began to sow the seeds of its own collapse". Although the spectacle of violent mob attacks had previously benefited white supremacists, Wood contends that after Washington's death was publicized, the anti-lynching movement included images of racially motivated brutality in their campaigns. Carrigan notes that Washington's death may have received more public attention than any other lynching in the United States, and sees the event as a "turning point in the history of mob violence in Central Texas". Although the outcry it provoked did not end the practice, it helped bring an end to public support of such attacks by city leaders. Carrigan states that the lynching was "the most infamous day in the history of central Texas" until the Waco siege of 1993.

After the practice of lynching was suppressed in central Texas, it received little attention from local historians. However, Waco developed a reputation for racism—propagated in part by American history textbooks—to the vexation of the city's white residents. In the years following the lynching, African Americans often held Waco in disdain, and some viewed the 1953 Waco tornado outbreak as divine retribution. White leaders of Waco took a non-violent approach in response to demonstrations during the Civil Rights Movement, possibly owing to a desire to avoid stigmatizing the city again.

Blues musician Sammy Price recorded a version of "Hesitation Blues" that referenced Washington's lynching. Price lived in Waco as a child, possibly at the time of Washington's death. Waco-based novelist Madison Cooper featured a lynching, thought to be based on Washington's death, as a key event in his 1952 novel Sironia, Texas.

In the 1990s, Lawrence Johnson, a member of Waco's city council, viewed pictures of the Washington lynching at the National Civil Rights Museum, and began to lobby for a monument to the lynching. In 2002, Lester Gibson, another member of the city council, proposed that a plaque be installed at the courthouse where Washington was lynched. He further stated that the plaque should carry an apology from the city. The ideas were discussed, but were not developed. In the 2000s, the idea of a memorial was revived by a McLennan County commissioner and the Waco Chamber of Commerce; the Waco Herald Tribune has editorialized in support of a historical marker on the site of the lynching. Some descendants of Fryer objected to the proposed memorial. On the centennial of the lynching, May 15, 2016, the mayor of Waco apologized in a formal ceremony to Washington's relatives and issued a proclamation condemning Washington's lynching and noting the anniversary of the event. A historical marker is being erected at the site.

Those unveiling the marker included relatives of Washington. Joining them were relatives of Sank Majors, a black man who was seized by a mob in 1905 while waiting retrial on rape charges and hanged from the Washington Avenue Bridge.

In the 2018 film BlacKkKlansman, Harry Belafonte portrays a witness to the lynching who describes the event to a civil rights rally in 1970s Colorado Springs.

== See also ==
- False accusations of rape as justification for lynchings

== Bibliography ==
=== Books ===
- Apel, Dora (2004). Imagery of Lynching: Black Men, White Women, and the Mob. Rutgers University Press. ISBN 978-0-8135-3459-6.
- Armstrong, Julie Buckner (2011). Mary Turner and the Memory of Lynching. University of Georgia Press. ISBN 978-0-8203-3765-4.
- Berg, Manfred (2011). Popular Justice: A History of Lynching in America. Government Institutes. ISBN 978-1-56663-802-9.
- Bernstein, Patricia (2006). The First Waco Horror: The Lynching of Jesse Washington and the Rise of the NAACP. Texas A&M University Press. ISBN 978-1-58544-544-8.
- Bernstein, Patricia (2007). "Waco Lynching". In Paul Finkelman (ed.). Encyclopedia of African American History, 1896 to the Present: From the Age of Segregation to the Twenty-First Century. Vol. 5. Oxford University Press. ISBN 978-0-19-516779-5.
- Carrigan, William D. (2006). The Making of a Lynching Culture: Violence and Vigilantism in Central Texas, 1836–1916. University of Illinois Press. ISBN 978-0-252-07430-1.
- DuRocher, Kristina (2011). Raising Racists: The Socialization of White Children in the Jim Crow South. University Press of Kentucky. ISBN 978-0-8131-3001-9.
- Gussow, Adam (2002). Seems Like Murder Here: Southern Violence and the Blues Tradition. University of Chicago Press. ISBN 978-0-226-31098-5.
- Hale, Grace Elizabeth (1998). Making Whiteness: the Culture of Segregation in the South, 1890–1940. Vintage Books. ISBN 978-0-679-77620-8.
- Lichtenstein, Andrew; Lichtenstein, Alex (2017). Marked Unmarked Remembered. A Geography of American Memory. West Virginia University Press. ISBN 978-1-94366-589-1.
- Nevels, Cynthia Skove (2007). Lynching to Belong: Claiming Whiteness Through Racial Violence. Texas A&M University Press. ISBN 978-1-58544-589-9.
- Rice, Anne P. (2003). Witnessing Lynching: American Writers Respond. Rutgers University Press. ISBN 978-0-8135-3330-8.
- SoRelle, James M. (2007). "The "Waco Horror": The Lynching of Jesse Washington". In Bruce A. Glasrud; James Smallwood (eds.). The African American Experience in Texas: An Anthology. Texas Tech University Press. ISBN 978-0-89672-609-3.
- Waldrep, Christopher (2009). African Americans Confront Lynching: Strategies of Resistance from the Civil War to the Civil Rights Era. Rowman & Littlefield. ISBN 978-0-7425-5272-2.
- Wood, Amy Louise (2009). Lynching and Spectacle: Witnessing Racial Violence in America, 1890–1940. University of North Carolina Press. ISBN 978-0-8078-3254-7.
- Zangrando, Robert L. (1980). The NAACP Crusade Against Lynching, 1909–1950. Temple University Press. ISBN 978-0-87722-174-6.

=== Journals ===
- Du Bois, W. E. B. (July 1916). "The Waco Horror" (PDF). The Crisis. 12 (Supplement to no. 3): 1–8. Archived from the original (PDF) on December 27, 2013 – via the Modernist Journals Project.
- Ehrenhaus, Peter; Owen, A. Susan (July–October 2004). "Race Lynching and Christian Evangelicalism: Performances of Faith". Text and Performance Quarterly. 24 (3/4): 276–301. doi:10.1080/1046293042000312779. S2CID 161449077.
- Francis, Megan Ming (2011). "The Battle for the Hearts and Minds of America". Souls: A Critical Journal of Black Politics, Culture, and Society. 13 (1): 46–71. doi:10.1080/10999949.2011.551477. S2CID 143935694.
- Wood, Amy Louise (2005). "Lynching Photography and the Visual Reproduction of White Supremacy". American Nineteenth Century History. 6 (3): 373–99. doi:10.1080/14664650500381090. S2CID 144176806.

=== Newspapers ===
- Blumenthal, Ralph (May 1, 2005). "Fresh Outrage in Waco at Grisly Lynching of 1916". The New York Times.
- Moreno, Sylvia (April 26, 2006). "In Waco, a Push to Atone for the Region's Lynch-Mob Past". The Washington Post.
