= Royal Freeman Nash =

American civil rights activist (1885–1982)

Executive Secretary of the NAACP
- In office 1916–1917
- Preceded by: Mary White Ovington
- Succeeded by: James Weldon Johnson

Personal details
- Born: February 22, 1885 Centralia, Wisconsin, U.S. (now Wisconsin Rapids)
- Died: April 28, 1982 (aged 97) Alameda, California, U.S.

Royal Freeman Nash (February 22, 1885 – April 28, 1982) was an American civil rights activist. He was the secretary-treasurer of the NAACP (National Association for the Advancement of Colored People) from February 15, 1916, to September 1, 1917.

== Career ==
Nash was born in Centralia, Wisconsin on February 22, 1885.

Nash was a white author. Historian Patricia Bernstein described him in 2006 as a social worker. He headed the North Carolina branch of the NAACP.

Before being made secretary, he had investigated fires in Cherokee County, Georgia, that the NAACP thought could be arson against Black people. His 1916 investigation also reported on attacks on Black people in Forsyth County, Georgia. Nash took office as secretary-treasurer in February 1916, but hadn't adopted a tangible program for the organization's future by mid-November. In February, Philip G. Peabody, a wealthy American, offered to donate $10,000, to the anti-lynching movement and wrote NAACP leader Moorfield Storey requesting a plan for how the organization would spend the money before he committed to donating it. To the fledgling NAACP, this was a vast sum, and Nash quickly worked to figure out how the money would be spent. He produced a lengthy report for Peabody proposing an extensive information campaign and other advocacy around the nation towards an anti-lynching law. Bernstein writes that "perhaps the NAACP did its job too well"; Peabody may have thought his money would not be sufficient for the program. He did not ever donate $10,000.

That same year he investigated the Lynching of Anthony Crawford in North Carolina. Nash's report was republished in newspapers around the country. He was torn between whether the NAACP needed to hire a new lawyer or official to work on publicity. Historian Charles Francis Kellogg describes this as having a chilling effect on his relations with prominent NAACP members Mary White Ovington and Oswald Garrison Villard. A committee was established shortly after to develop plans for 1917 and the NAACP hired its first field secretary, James Weldon Johnson. As secretary, Nash was intensely focused on the NAACP's Federal Aid Committee—in 1917 Ovington wrote that he spent half of his time with the committee.

In the aftermath of the Lynching of Jesse Washington he worked with Elisabeth Freeman to investigate. The day after the lynching, Nash contacted Freeman and advised her on how to best investigate the lynching. He requested that she gather large amounts of information, including interviewing locals, legal evidence, and images. Nash also provided Freeman with a copy of his investigation in Georgia. The NAACP sought to publicize the lynching widely to aid anti-lynching movements. Nash and Freeman were unable to get the lynching prosecuted, though they were successful in widely publicizing it.

Nash proposed changing the name of the NAACP to a name honoring several white figures associated with the abolition of slavery in the US, suggesting "The [William Lloyd] Garrison Association,” “The Wendell Phillips Association,” and “The [Abraham] Lincoln Association” because he thought the organization's name was "cumbersome". Nash left his role in May 1917 to serve in World War I, entering training for officers. He initially took a leave of absence but by September was forced to resign, in part due to his large involvement with the Federal Aid Committee. Nash remained involved in the NAACP. Nash later expressed guilt that he had left the organization. In the army he rose to the rank of captain in the field artillery and was transferred to the 167th Field Artillery Brigade, a brigade made up of Black soldiers.

Historians August Meier and Elliott Rudwick conclude that Nash was "singularly ineffective" as secretary.

Nash died in California on April 28, 1982, at the age of 98.

== Bibliography ==
- Kellogg, Charles Flint (1967). NAACP : a history of the National Association for the Advancement of Colored People; volume I 1909-1920. Johns Hopkins Press. ISBN 978-0-8018-0331-4.
- Rudwick, Elliott; Meier, August (1976). "The Rise of the Black Secretariat in the NAACP, 1909-35". In Kellogg, Charles Flint (ed.). Along the color line, explorations in the Black experience : [essays]. University of Illinois Press. ISBN 978-0-252-00636-4.
- Verney, Kevern; Sartain, Lee (2009). Long is the way and hard : one hundred years of the National Association for the Advancement of Colored People (NAACP). University of Arkansas Press. ISBN 978-1-55728-909-4.
- Bernstein, Patricia (2006). The First Waco Horror: The Lynching of Jesse Washington and the Rise of the NAACP. College Station: Texas A&M University Press. ISBN 978-1-60344-547-4 – via Project MUSE.
