= Jane Freeman =

Jane Freeman may refer to:

- Jane Freeman (actress) (1935–2017), English-born Welsh actress
- Jane Freeman (artist) (1871–1963), English-born American portrait painter

== See also ==
- Jane Friedman, CEO
