= Roy Nash =

Roy Nash may refer to:

- Royal Freeman Nash (1885-1982), American civil rights activist
- Roy Nash (boxer) (born 1966), Northern Irish boxer, medallist in boxing at the 1986 Commonwealth Games
