= The Making of a Lynching Culture =

The Making of a Lynching Culture: Violence and Vigilantism in Central Texas, 1836–1916
- Author: William D. Carrigan
- Subject: History Lynching in the United States
- Publisher: University of Illinois Press
- Publication date: 2004
- Pages: 308
- ISBN: 0252029518

The Making of a Lynching Culture: Violence and Vigilantism in Central Texas, 1836–1916 is a 2004 book by American historian William D. Carrigan. The book takes a chronological look at the prevalence of lynching in central Texas. The first three chapters document the antebellum period and lynchings of Indigenous people, Mexicans, and White Americans, and how the circumstances around these lynchings molded a culture of lynching in the area. The later four chapters documents the lynchings of African Americans from after the Civil War through the Nadir of American race relations. Special focus is given to the 1916 Lynching of Jesse Washington in Waco, Texas.

== Commentary and reviews ==
- Barr, Alwyn (2006). "Review of The Making of a Lynching Culture: Violence and Vigilantism in Central Texas, 1836-1916". Great Plains Quarterly. 26 (1): 52–53. ISSN 0275-7664.
- Browne, Ray B. (March 2007). "Rough Justice: Lynching and American Society 1874–1974 by Michael J. Pfeifer and The Making of a Lynching Culture: Violence and Vigilantism in Central Texas 1836–1916 by William D. Carrigan". The Journal of American Culture. 30 (1): 135–135. doi:10.1111/j.1542-734X.2007.00493.x.
- Buenger, Walter L. (2006). "Review of The Making of a Lynching Culture: Violence and Vigilantism in Central Texas, 1836-1916; The First Waco Horror: The Lynching of Jesse Washington and the Rise of the NAACP". The Southwestern Historical Quarterly. 110 (1): 160–162. ISSN 0038-478X.
- De La Roche, Roberta Senechal (1 May 2006). "Review of Carrigan, The Making of a Lynching Culture: Violence and Vigilantism in Central Texas, 1836-1916". Pacific Historical Review. 75 (2): 343–344. doi:10.1525/phr.2006.75.2.343.
- Dearinger, Ryan (1 July 2006). "The Making of a Lynching Culture: Violence and Vigilantism in Central Texas, 1836-1916". The Western Historical Quarterly. 37 (2): 238. doi:10.2307/25443357.
- Markovitz, J. (1 February 2006). "WILLIAM D. CARRIGAN. The Making of a Lynching Culture: Violence and Vigilantism in Central Texas, 1836 - 1916". The American Historical Review. 111 (1): 209–210. doi:10.1086/ahr.111.1.209.
- McDonald, Archie P (December 2006). "Texas after the Civil War: The Struggle of Reconstruction, and: The Making of a Lynching Culture: Violence and Vigilantism in Central Texas, 1836-1916 (review)". Civil War History. 52 (4): 439–440. doi:10.1353/cwh.2006.0088.
- Pfeifer, Michael J. (1 December 2005). "Review of The Making of a Lynching Culture: Violence and Vigilantism in Central Texas, 1836-1916 by William D. Carrigan". Journal of American History. 92 (3): 1022–1023. doi:10.2307/3660069.
- Ross, John (2005). "Review of The Making of a Lynching Culture: Violence and Vigilantism in Central Texas, 1836-1916". The Journal of Southern History. 71 (4): 912–913. doi:10.2307/27648945. ISSN 0022-4642.
- Tolnay, Stewart E. (2006). "Review of The Making of a Lynching Culture. Violence and Vigilantism in Central Texas, 1836?1916". International Review of Social History. 51 (1): 133–136. ISSN 0020-8590.
- Vandal, Gilles (2005). "Review of The Making of a Lynching Culture: Violence and Vigilantism in Central Texas, 1836-1916". Journal of Social History. 39 (2): 555–556. ISSN 0022-4529.
