= Fred Gildersleeve =

American photographer (1881 – 1958)

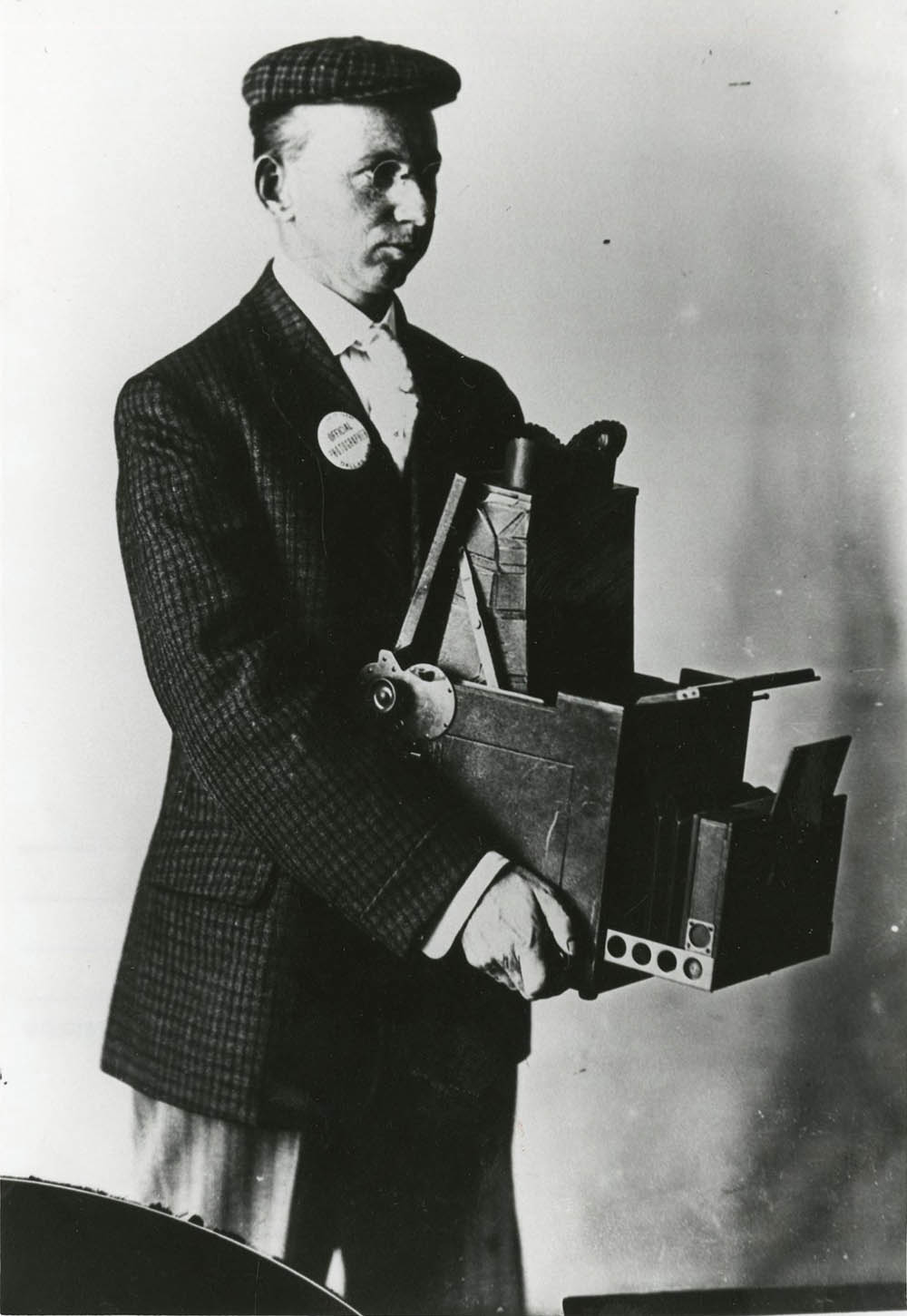
- Self-portrait of Gildersleeve in 1909
- Born: June 1881; Boulder, Colorado, United States
- Died: February 26, 1958 (aged 76)
- Occupation: Photographer
- Known for: Helped pioneer aerial photography, panoramas, and light manipulation techniques

Fred A. "Gildy" Gildersleeve (June 1881 – February 26, 1958) was an American photographer. His work helped pioneer aerial photography, panoramas, and light manipulation techniques. After settling in Waco, Texas, in 1905, Gildersleeve captured thousands of photographs depicting the city as it experienced an unprecedented period of growth. He first received recognition for his images of a biplane circling the Amicable building in 1911 and the Cotton Palace.

In May 1916, he was on the scene when Jesse Washington, a Black teenage farmhand, was lynched in front of a large crowd of onlookers. Gildersleeve's pictures of the event offer rare imagery of a lynching in progress. He printed and sold images of Jesse Washington’s mutilated body as souvenir postcards. Gildersleeve profited immensely from his postcards that depicted Black lynching victims, selling them for a premium, and often splitting the proceeds with local mayors who allowed him to set up his camera equipment first at advertised lynching sites.

== Early life and education ==
Fred A. Gildersleeve was born in Boulder, Colorado, in June 1881 but was raised in Kirksville, Missouri. In his youth, Gildersleeve was a race horse jockey, competing in county fairs throughout the state. While attending the state normal school, his mother purchased him an 1898 Kodak box camera. For 25 cents each, Gildersleeve sold images of fellow students to pay for his education. The aspiring photographer honed his craft by studying the trade further at an institute in Effingham, Illinois. Following his time in Effingham, Gildersleeve found work in Chicago before finally settling in Waco, Texas, in 1905 to manage his own studio.

== Career ==
Often working in tandem with his assistant Herbert Guinn, Gildersleeve rode through the city in an Excelsior motorbike and sidecar – later a Model T Ford – to capture scenes of everyday life in the city; his imagery of Waco's developing infrastructure and its populace was well received by the townspeople who fully welcomed and affectionately came to know the photographer as "Gildy". As his popularity rose, Gildersleeve was commissioned more than any other photographer in Waco for local events and meetings, including his roles as official photographer for Baylor University and the State Fair of Texas.

"He was a man obsessed with freezing the moment in his adopted hometown", according to writer Joe Holley; indeed, thousands of photographs are credited to Gildersleeve, including his 1911 image of the Amicable building, Waco's first skyscraper, being circled in flight by aviator Calbraith Perry Rodgers. A few years later, he created a 12-foot wide panorama of the Cotton Palace, the world's largest photo at the time, and had it featured in exhibits across the United States. Gildersleeve's ambition to capture new perspectives of Waco's landmarks led him to pioneer aerial photography as he flew in biplanes.

=== Lynching of Jesse Washington ===
On May 15, 1916, a guilty verdict and a death sentence were announced at Waco's courthouse for Jesse Washington, a seventeen-year-old black farmhand, in complicity of the murder of Lucy Fryer, who was found dead seven days earlier. Attendees crowded the courthouse and sidewalks in anticipation of the trial; the crowd of about 2,000 spectators was almost entirely white aside from a few members of the city's black community. As officers approached Washington to escort him out of the courtroom, spectators pushed them aside and forcibly dragged Washington outside. Amid a growing mob, a chain was wrapped around Washington's neck, and he was stripped and beaten as he was taken to city hall. A bonfire was prepared next to a tree; doused in oil, Washington was repeatedly lowered into the flames and slowly burned to death in front of nearly 15,000 onlookers.

Perhaps at the request of mayor John Dollins, Gildersleeve arrived at the third floor of city hall shortly before Washington's lynching and photographed the event. His photographs offer rare depictions of an event in progress: views of the large crowd from the building and closer shots of Washington's corpse, possibly taken by an assistant. In some images, individuals from the crowd gathered around Washington to collect souvenirs from his body, making no attempts to hide their identities. Afterwards, Gildersleeve produced postcards of the lynching, a common practice of the era. A few postcards were sent out-of-state but local citizens persuaded Gildersleeve to stop selling them, fearing that the images would harm Waco's reputation.

=== Later life ===
Later in his career, hundreds of acetate negatives belonging to Gildersleeve were lost following divorce with his wife of thirty years. He experienced a significant decline in his health in the 1950s; on February 26, 1958, he died aged 77. Gildersleeve's will left his collection of 1,400 photographs to Roger Norman Conger, a Waco-based historian who, in an effort to preserve the images, donated Gildersleeve's work to the Texas Collection at Baylor University and the Lee Lockwood Library and Museum in Waco.
