= Elisabeth Freeman =

American suffragist (1876–1942)

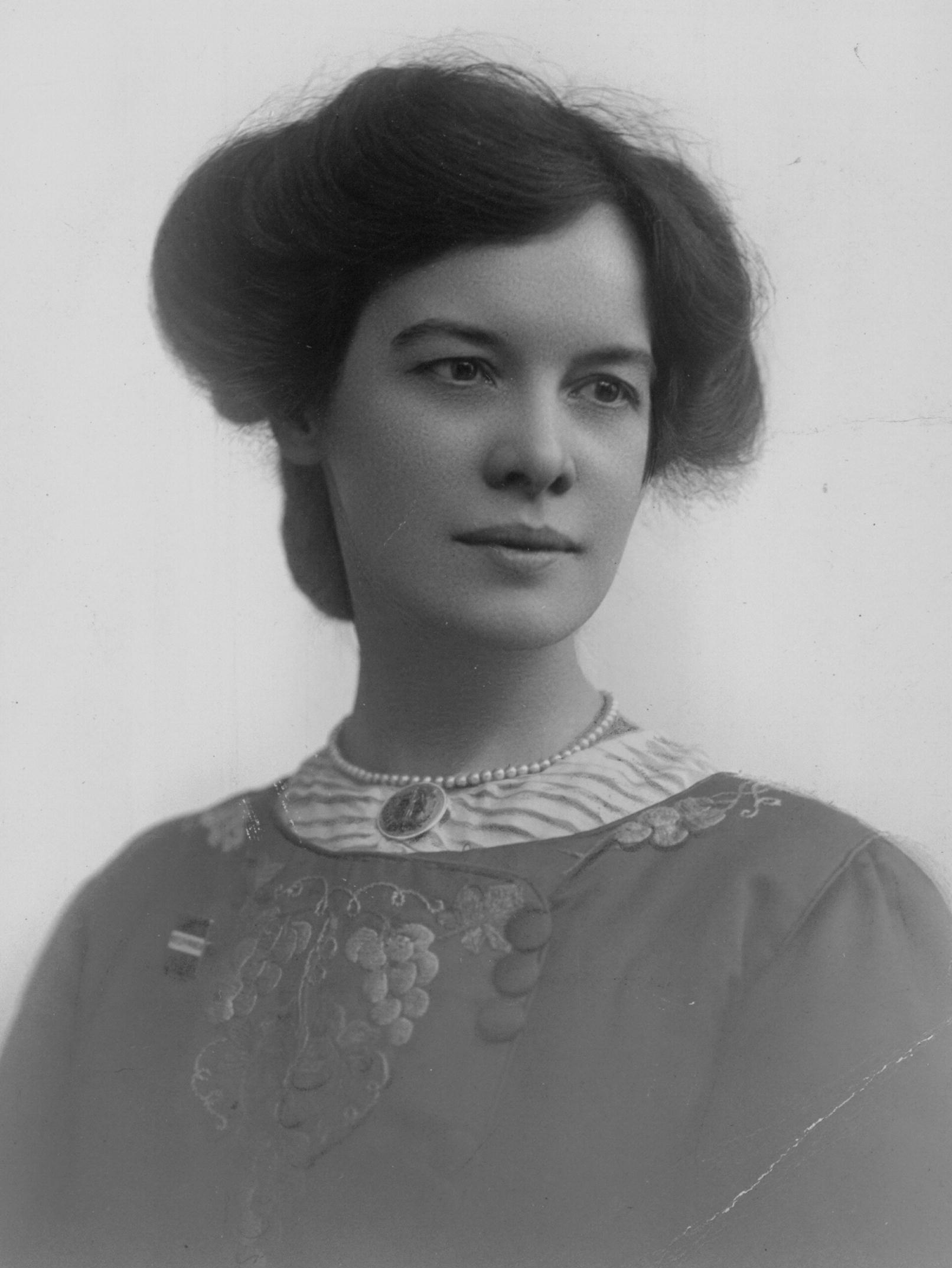
- Freeman, circa 1910s
- Born: September 12, 1876; England
- Died: February 27, 1942 (aged 65)
- Organizations: Christian Science Church; Fellowship of Reconciliation; NAACP; National Woman's Party
- Movement: Women's suffrage

Elisabeth Freeman (September 12, 1876 – February 27, 1942) was a British-born American suffragist and civil rights activist, best known for her investigative report for the National Association for the Advancement of Colored People (NAACP) on the May 1916 spectacle lynching of Jesse Washington in Waco, Texas, known as the "Waco Horror". In addition, she was active in suffragist conventions and activities, known for her participation in the 1913 Suffrage Hike from New York City to Washington, D.C. Born in the United Kingdom, she had immigrated as a child to the United States with her mother and siblings, and lived in her early years in an orphanage.

== Biography ==
Elisabeth Freeman was born in Britain in 1876 to Mary Hall Freeman, who was estranged from her husband. Elisabeth was the younger sister of Jane Freeman, who became a notable artist. Elisabeth, her mother, and siblings Clara (Jane) and John moved to the United States, where they lived on Long Island, New York. Mary worked for St. Johnland orphanage, where her children lived for a while.

Growing up poor, Elisabeth Freeman gained only a limited education. She was said to have found only her activities for The Salvation Army to be "uplifting". Freeman moved for a time back to London, where she helped a woman who was beaten by a policeman; both women were arrested after the confrontation. This woman brought Freeman into the suffrage movement, within which she learned the arts of campaigning, including public speaking, media work and recruitment. Having developed such skills in London, Freeman used them after returning to the US, where she was employed by the suffrage movement.

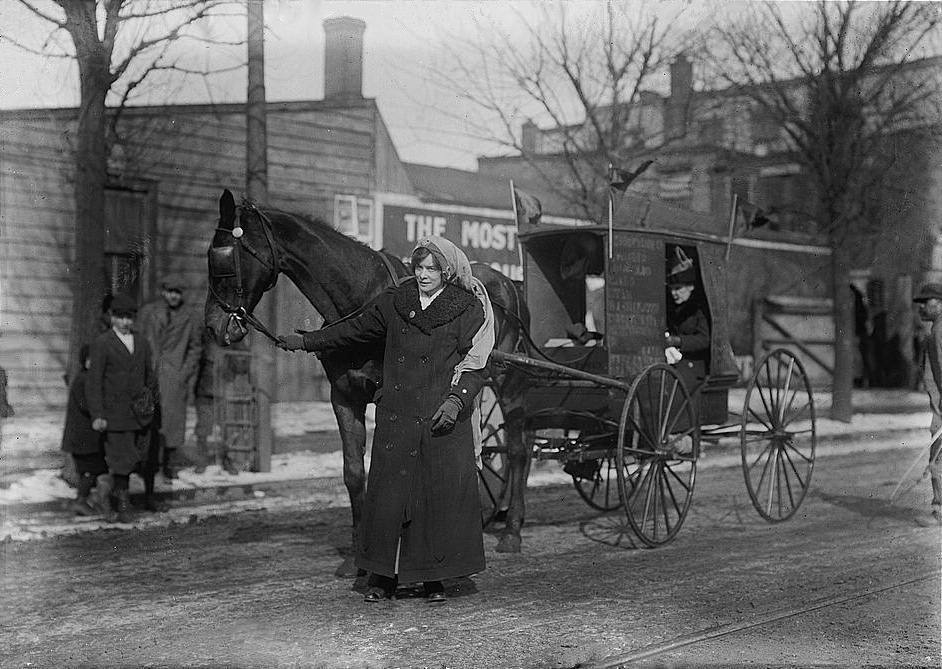
Elisabeth Freeman in 1913

A notable example of Freeman's activism occurred in 1913, when she took part in the national Suffrage Hike to the inauguration of President Woodrow Wilson in Washington, D.C. As a publicity stunt for a New York City suffrage march, she wore Romani regalia and drove a wagon stenciled with 'Votes for Women' slogans and piled with women's suffrage literature.

She attended a statewide suffrage convention in Dallas, Texas in May 1916. A crowd of 10,000 witnessed the brutal lynching of Jesse Washington, a young African-American farmhand convicted of murder in Waco, Texas. Royal Freeman Nash, the secretary of the NAACP, contacted Freeman, hiring her to investigate and report on the murder and events.

For a week, claiming to be a reporter, she talked to both African Americans and White Americans in Waco about the events. Her report on the lynching to W. E. B. Du Bois was used by the NAACP to publicize the case and garner national attention over the outrage of lynching American citizens. Their campaign helped establish the organization as a force for civil rights. In this period the NAACP was based in New York City; it hung banners outside its office publicizing lynchings. Its attorneys became involved in the defense of numerous African Americans in cases across the country.

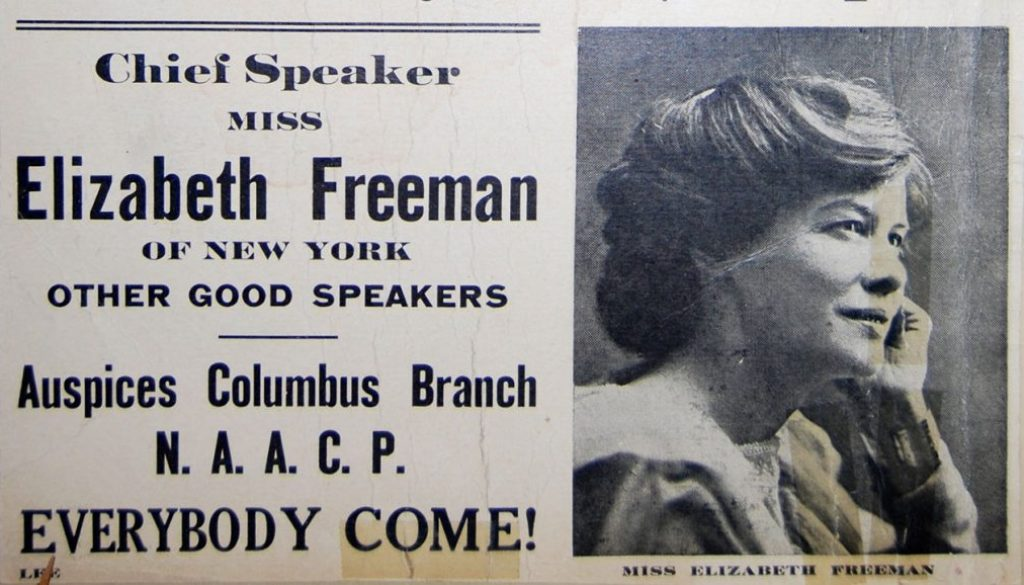
Elizabeth Freeman speaking at NAACP

In the years between 1917 and 1919, when the United States was involved in the Great War (World War I) in Europe, Freeman was active for the peace movement. She lobbied Congress and also continued her work fighting for the cause of civil rights. Speaking up against US policies concerning the war generated strong reactions in opposition.

Freeman owned an antique store in Provincetown, Massachusetts from 1925 until 1937, when she moved to Pasadena, California for health reasons. She died of pleurisy in February 1942.

== See also ==
- List of suffragists and suffragettes
- List of women's rights activists
- Timeline of women's suffrage
