= Patricia Bernstein =

American novelist

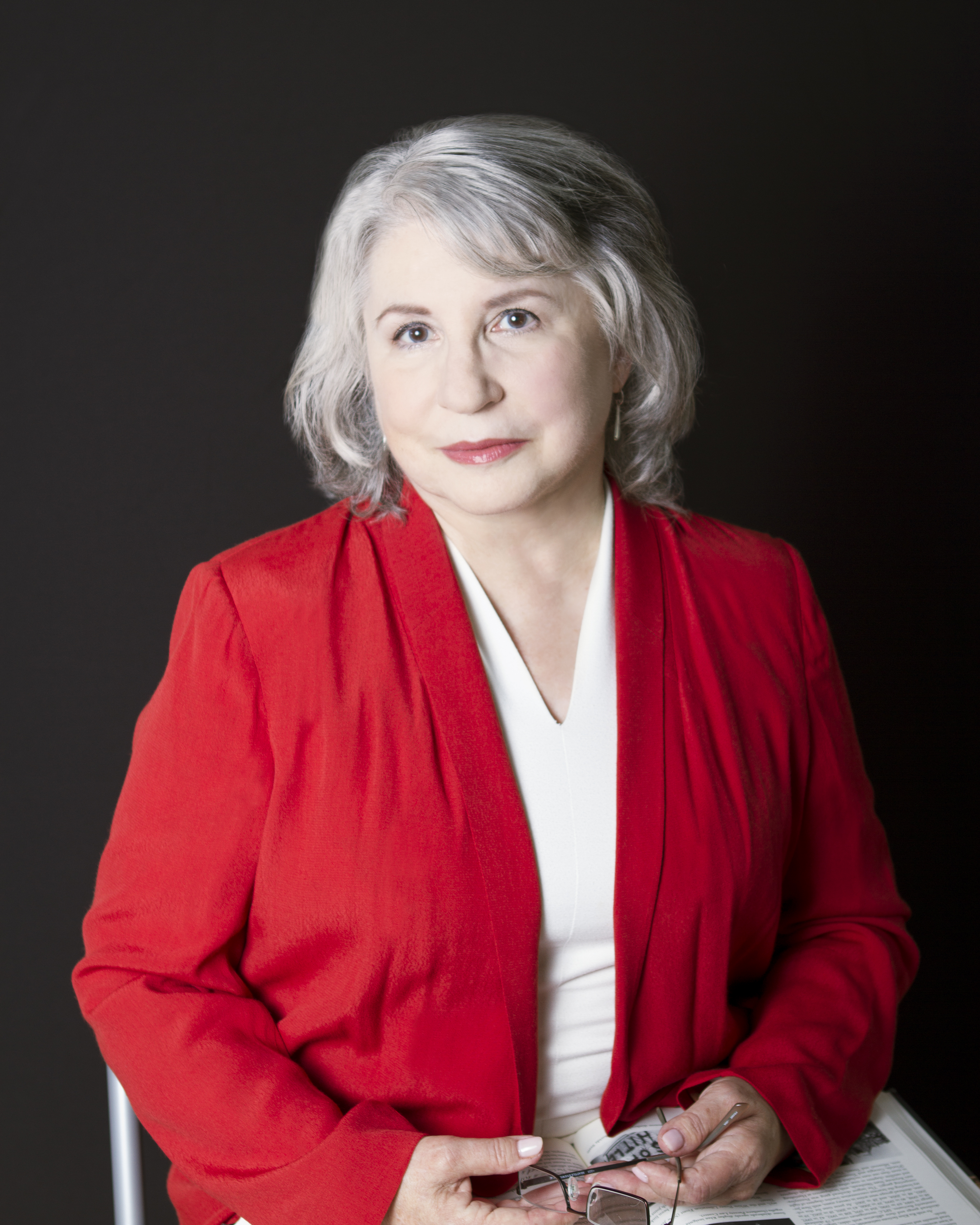
- Patricia Bernstein
- Born: Patricia Jane Hoffman; 1944 (age 81–82); El Paso, Texas
- Education: Smith College
- Occupation: Writer · public relations expert
- Years active: 1974–present
- Notable work: The First Waco Horror: the Lynching of Jesse Washington and the Rise of the NAACP
- Spouse: Alan Bernstein
- Website: patriciabernstein.com

Patricia Bernstein (née Hoffman; born in 1944) is an American writer and public relations expert. She is best known for her books Ten Dollars to Hate: The Texas Man Who Fought the Klan, The First Waco Horror: The Lynching of Jesse Washington and the Rise of the NAACP, and debut novel, A Noble Cunning: The Countess and the Tower.

== Biography ==
A native Texan, Patricia Bernstein was born in El Paso and grew up in Dallas. She graduated from Smith College with a Degree of Distinction in American studies, having studied with such prominent academics as historian Arthur Mann, Cervantes authority Juan Bautista Avalle-Arce, and literary scholar Daniel Aaron. She was named to Phi Beta Kappa during her junior year at Smith. Most of her college education was supported by a generous scholarship from Procter & Gamble. She subsequently audited courses at Rice University in Latin and medieval history.

Bernstein started her own public relations firm in Houston in 1983. The firm has now been in business for over 40 years.

She is also a writer and historian, who has published numerous newspaper and magazine articles in media as diverse as Smithsonian, Texas Monthly and Cosmopolitan. She has published four books. Her first book, Having a Baby: Mothers Tell Their Stories, a collection of first-person childbirth experiences from the 1890s to the 1990s, was published by Pocket Books, a division of Simon & Schuster.

In 2005, Bernstein's second book, The First Waco Horror: The Lynching of Jesse Washington and the Rise of the NAACP, was published by Texas A&M University Press. The book tells the story of the lynching of Jesse Washington in Waco in 1916, how the lynching affected the growth of the fledgling National Association for the Advancement of Colored People (NAACP), and how a young women's suffrage activist was drafted by the NAACP to go to Waco and investigate the lynching.

The book was covered by dozens of media outlets, including The New York Times, The Washington Post, The Dallas Morning News, National Public Radio and the Canadian Broadcasting Corporation. In 2012, Bernstein was asked to do an interview about the lynching of Jesse Washington and the early years of the NAACP for the NAACP Archives.

Bernstein's third book, Ten Dollars to Hate: The Texas Man Who Fought the Klan, was published in 2017 by Texas A&M University Press. Ten Dollars to Hate was a finalist for the Ramirez Family Award from the Texas Institute of Letters and was named twice by the Austin American-Statesman as one of the 53 best books ever written about Texas.

The book tells the story of the only mass-movement version of the Ku Klux Klan (KKK), the 1920s Klan, which had between three and five million members across the entire U.S., not just in the Deep South. Revived in 1915 by a failed preacher and vigorously promoted by two Atlanta publicists, the 1920s KKK seized municipal government and law enforcement in many communities, indulged in extravagant violence against whites and blacks alike, and actually elected Klan governors and sent Klan senators to Washington.

The book's hero is a 29-year-old Texas district attorney Dan Moody who, in a series of dramatic trials in Georgetown, Texas, in 1923, was the first prosecutor to succeed in convicting several Klansmen for a vicious assault and getting them serious prison time. He became a national sensation overnight, was elected Texas' youngest governor ever in 1926, and was considered for the vice-presidential spot on a national ticket with Franklin Roosevelt.

Bernstein’s third book was widely reviewed by regional and national outlets including NPR’s Morning Edition, the Austin American-Statesman and Texas Monthly.

In 2023, Patricia Bernstein published her first novel with History Through Fiction, a traditional, small press. The novel, A Noble Cunning: The Countess and the Tower, is based on the true story of Winifred Maxwell, Countess of Nithsdale, a persecuted Catholic noblewoman who, in 1716, rescued her husband from the Tower of London the night before his scheduled execution with the help of a small group of devoted women friends. A Noble Cunning debuted as the #1 Amazon bestseller in Scottish Historical Fiction and was also a bestseller in other historical fiction categories. The novel has been covered in Texas publications, a Scottish newspaper, and the Smith College Alumnae Quarterly.

A Noble Cunning has been awarded gold medals by the American Bookfest and the IPPY Awards (Independent Book Publishers), and has been named best Catholic Novel of 2023 by the Catholic Media Association as part of the 2024 CMA Book Awards.

== Personal life ==
Ms. Bernstein is married to Alan Bernstein and has three daughters. Alan Bernstein was a newspaper reporter and editor for 33 years and is now a public relations specialist.

== Bibliography ==
- —— (1993). Having a Baby: Mothers Tell Their Stories. Pocket Books. ISBN 978-0-671-72614-0.
- —— (2006). The First Waco Horror: The Lynching of Jesse Washington and the Rise of the NAACP. Texas A&M University Press. ISBN 978-1-58544-544-8.
- —— (2017). Ten Dollars to Hate: The Texas Man Who Fought the Klan. Texas A&M University Press. ISBN 978-1-62349-529-9.
- —— (2023). A Noble Cunning: The Countess and the Tower. History Through Fiction. ISBN 978-1-73649-906-1.

== Sources ==
- Bernstein, Patricia (February 19, 2017). "An 'inclination to evil'". Houston Chronicle. Houston: Hearst Communications Inc.
- Smith, J.B. (May 15, 2016). "'Waco Horror" At 100". Waco Tribune. Waco, Texas: Waco Tribune-Herald.
- Goodwyn, Wade (May 13, 2006). "Waco Recalls a 90-Year-Old 'Horror'". National Public Radio All Things Considered. Houston: National Public Radio.
- Moreno, Sylvia (April 26, 2006). "In Waco, a Push To Atone for The Region's Lynch-Mob Past". Washington Post.

- Sloan, Stephen; Reilly, Ezra (May 11, 2016). "Waco's Unfinished Legacy: Part 2 – The Waco Horror". KWBU Heart of Texas Public Radio. Waco, TX: KWBU/Brazos Valley Public Broadcasting Foundation.
- Hoppa, Kristin (January 28, 2016). "Groups address Waco's 'unfinished legacy' almost 100 years after Jesse Washington lynching". Waco Tribune-Herald. Waco, TX: Waco Tribune-Herald.
- Cox, Mike (July 3, 2005). "Ghost of 1916 lynching still haunts Texas city" (PDF). Austin American-Statesman. Austin, TX: Cox Media Group.
- Clack, Cary (May 22, 2005). "Solid work examines 1916 Waco lynching" (PDF). San Antonio Express-News. San Antonio, TX: Hearst for San Antonio Express-News.
- Wisch, Steve (March 31, 2005). "New book recounts Waco lynching of 1916" (PDF). Texas Jewish Post. Dallas, TX: Jimmy Wisch.
