= Manfred Berg =

German historian

Manfred Berg is a German historian who serves as the Curt Engelhorn Chair in American History at Heidelberg University. He has also served as Heidelberg University's dean of faculty. He previously taught at the Free University of Berlin and served at the German Historical Institute in Washington D.C.

Since spring 2017, Berg is speaker of the Graduiertenkolleg "Authority and Trust in American Culture Society, History, and Politics" (GKAT) at the Heidelberg Center for American Studies (HCA).

Since 2019, Berg is a regular member of the Heidelberg Academy of Sciences and Humanities.

== Works ==
- Gustav Stresemann und die Vereinigten Staaten von Amerika: Weltwirtschaftliche Verflechtung und Revisionspolitik 1907–1929. Nomos, Baden-Baden 1990, ISBN 3-7890-2087-7.
- Gustav Stresemann: Eine politische Karriere zwischen Reich und Republik. Muster-Schmidt, Göttingen 1992, ISBN 3-7881-0141-5.
- The ticket to freedom: Die NAACP und das Wahlrecht der Afro-Amerikaner. Campus, Frankfurt on the Main 2000, ISBN 3-593-36534-0.
  - The ticket to freedom: The NAACP and the Struggle for Black Political Integration. Gainesville: University Press of Florida, 2005, ISBN 978-0-8130-3701-1.
- Popular Justice: A History of Lynching in America. Ivan R. Dee, Chicago 2011, ISBN 978-1-56663-802-9.
  - Lynchjustiz in den USA. Hamburger Edition, Hamburg 2014, ISBN 978-3-86854-273-8.
- Geschichte der USA (= Oldenbourg Grundriss der Geschichte. Bd. 42). Oldenbourg, Munich 2013, ISBN 978-3-486-70482-2.
- Woodrow Wilson. Amerika und die Neuordnung der Welt. Eine Biographie. C. H. Beck, Munich 2017, ISBN 978-3-406-70778-0.
