= Sironia, Texas =

1952 novel by Madison Cooper

- Author: Madison Cooper
- Language: English
- Published: 1952
- Publisher: Houghton Mifflin
- Publication place: United States

Sironia, Texas is a novel by American author Madison Cooper that describes life in the fictional town of Sironia, Texas, in the early 20th century. The book won the Houghton Mifflin Literary Award. Sironia is widely thought to be a thinly disguised version of Cooper's hometown of Waco, Texas. The book contains over 1,700 pages, making it one of the longest novels in the English language. Written over a period of 11 years, it was published in 1952. It sold 25,000 copies in its initial printing, but quickly faded from public view. Cooper subtly satirized upper-class southerners throughout the book.

== Synopsis ==
Follows the fortunes and failures of the citizens of Sironia, Texas in the early years of the 20th century. Though just a young child at the story's beginning, Tam Lipscomb, the son of a prosperous merchant, will go on to become the novel's central character. Also covered are the lives of the "Hill Families" (the Thaxtons, Storrows and Hadyns), Sironia's version of royalty and three branches of the old Reardon family tree. Likewise the town's black folk are followed in their own triumphs and defeats; they experience success in family life and also bitter racism due to interracial marriage.

== Plot ==
=== Book One: Thaxton Hill ===
Marshal Lipscomb, a local merchant, spends the night with friends Calvin Thaxton and Bill Elliot at his cabin on Suicide Bluff. Calvin is the patriarch of one of Sironia’s “Hill Families”, who are all related through the Reardon Family line, and Bill is an ex-circus roustabout who’s done well in business. Calvin and Marshall remain good friends despite Marshall’s star-crossed love affair with Milly Thaxton, Calvin’s wife, when they were young.

On the night of Milly Thaxton’s annual Last Friday party, Moira Lipscomb hides in a pavilion, or “summerhouse”, to spy on the party, which her husband has attended alone. Jed Hadyn slips outside with the attractive Laurine Lane, whose scream upon discovering the spying Moira draws the attention of the party.

Laurine’s mother has hopes the girl will marry the wealthy Jed, while Milly Thaxton hopes Laurine will marry her son Lance, whose intellectual disability Milly is in denial of. Plain-looking orphan Trina Storrow shares a cabin with old Cousin Nathalia near Storrow Manor. Some in the family hope Trina will marry Jed someday, but Trina knows he wants Laurine.

Hazel Elliott holds a First Friday party at her home, called the Elliott Hotel, which Milly refuses to attend. Jed leaves the party early with Laurine and they have sex. They return to the party, where Jed is pressured into dancing with Trina, both aware of the family machinations to pair them together.

Marshall is invited to Syringa, a home near the Lipscomb cabin, by Young Tom Bly. Tom, the estranged half-sibling of Hazel Elliott, needs an executor for his will. Patsy Garrick, one of Tom's lovers, eavesdrops as Tom reveals a secret to Marshall.

Having fled home after an argument with her mother, Laurine offers to marry Lance Thaxton, offending Milly due to a rumor the girl is pregnant. Laurine leaves Sironia with a traveling salesman. Cousin Nettie Hicks Vaughan, who has helped run the household since the deaths of Jed and three-year-old Nelia's parents, horrifies Jed by attempting to force herself on him sexually. Jed flees to see Trina, asking her to marry him.

Mammy watches over her grandchildren. Bill Elliott offers the children a buggy ride on his buggy, showing particular interest in Jared. Marshall is approached by Patsy Garrick, who flirts with him. When he does not reciprocate, she alludes to knowing a secret that could hurt people, giving him an address in New Orleans where can visit her.

Calvin receives a telegram from a man named Jalloux who he and Bill have given money for oil land in Beaumont. The oil wells have come in but Jalloux needs more money. Milly is wary about the deal; Calvin agrees to wire friends in Beaumont.

Caleb Hone, editor of the Sironia Sentinel, frets as one of the town's recurring floods nears. He asks Hazel Elliott to head flood relief efforts. When the flood hits, relief supplies and tempers grow short. Hazel is rushed by Bill to the Skating-Rink Ward, where the women sheltering there have rebelled against Milly, who is aiding in the efforts. Milly is being confronted by a mob of women led by Mrs Temple. Hazel grabs a buggy whip and wades in, lashing Mrs. Temple into submission.

On a drunken night, Calvin and Bill engage in a race over a bridge. Later, Marshall finds their buggies have plunged over the side; both Calvin and Bill are dead. Hazel requests that the men have a joint funeral, but Milly refuses. Word comes in from Beaumont. Mysteriously, Jalloux holds all the land where oil was found while the land held by the others is dry. Hazel plans to sell the Elliott Hotel and move to a smaller house, while Milly will use money from an inheritance to pay off Calvin’s debts.

A few years pass. Milly is visited by family, Sallie Jane Hicks and her daughters, Violet and nine-year-old Bessie. Tam Lipscomb attends a party at Mammy's home. Luella is vain about her teeth, the best in Sironia. Jared is a serious boy near Tam's age. Bennie entertains them with physical gags. Mulatto Leah Smith, working for Carietta, drops in to play. Nelia rides up, and the children play hide-and-seek. Leah frets over her "place" in Sironia due to her biracial status. Mammy says that white folks and black folks are supposed to stay with their own kind; mixed-race folks, like Leah and Jared, must stay with the black folks.

A doctor warns Trina that three miscarriages have made it unsafe to get pregnant. Hazel offers to get some contraception for her. Having learned that Jed is having an affair, Trina seduces him. After promising she’s on contraception, they have sex, and Jed promises not to cheat anymore. In reality, Trina means to get pregnant despite the risk.

Young Tom requests to meet with Hazel. Before going, she visits Nanette Lane. Rumor is that Laurine, running a brothel under the name Lola Wagrill, was driven from New Orleans by vigilantes. Tom shows Hazel a package found in Calvin’s things containing cash, and an agreement between Bill and Calvin for the latter to use the money to help Bill's illegitimate child if he should die. Tom shows the record of the only child born in Sironia on the date mentioned, shocking her. Later, Jared arrives at Hazel's, unsure why she summoned him. Hazel searches Jared's face, noticing similarities to Bill.

Patsy Garrick plans to meet Marshall at his cabin. She goes to see Young Tom, teasing him with all she knows about the "storm of 1861". At the cabin, Patsy is armed with a pistol. Walking the Bluff, Patsy hears someone coming through the woods. Thinking it's Marshall, she turns around and recognizes a different person coming at her.

Caleb pens a rant against Sironia. Among the topics are rumors of Jed cheating with a “Polish redhead”, Jared and his parentage, and the disappearance of Patsy Garrick. Caleb catches his office helper, Wolfgang, spying over his shoulder. He threatens to fire the boy before ripping up the papers. Later, Caleb runs into Mr. Lane, who shows him the day’s paper. Caleb realizes that Wolfgang retrieved the torn-up diatribe about Sironia and printed it.

Jed flirts with waitress Della Kolchak at the depot restaurant. Jed is summoned to a pow-wow of family and friends to discuss the controversial news article. Caleb has temporarily closed the paper and left town. Jed admits what was written about him is true. After the meeting, Lance tells Milly that he saw Moira rowing towards the Bluff on the day Patsy Garrick disappeared, saying he told Splice Rogan about it. Trina is injured during a Hadyn Hill party, with Nathalia finding her badly injured. A drunken Jed comes home and Moira breaks the news. Trina had gone up to the attic to spy on Jed at the depot, and tripped coming back down. Both Trina and the baby are dead.

=== Book Two: Storrow Hill ===
It is now 1910, and Tam is fifteen years old. He has a contentious relationship with Cousin Ruth, who is staying with the Lipscombs. Tam gets permission to take the buggy to drive his friends to a dance. The next morning, Ruth tells Marshall about Tam sneaking in and being thrown out of the dance. Marshall whips Tam with a crop, but Tam snatches it away and flees on his bicycle. He hides in Mammy’s corn crib. After dark, Tam rides by his house. Marshall is worried, and Moira has sent Ruth home. Tam hands his father the riding crop, signaling that he’s ready for his punishment. Marshall whips him, telling Tam never to make him do this again.

Young Tom bought the newspaper during Caleb’s absence, helping it stay afloat. The day after Trina’s death, it was learned that Jed married to Della Kolchak, who many feel took advantage of Jed’s drunken grief. He has not allowed Della to stay on Hadyn Hill, keeping her out at his farm. Caleb, back in town, spots a tall, redheaded woman disembark at the depot. It’s Laurine Lane, now known as Lola Wagrill. Lola is driven to the town’s whorehouse, which she intends to buy.

Tam and his friends find the body of a woman in the river. The woman is identified as Patsy Garrick. Marshall admits to Moira that he’d gone up to the cabin with a revolver, but found that Patsy had fallen from the Bluff. Panicked, Marshall buried her where she’d fallen, her grave proving adequate until the recent flooding. Moira meets with Young Tom. She worries that Oscar Rogan, who wants to run for Congress, will use the Garrick case to win public support. Moira admits meeting Patsy on the Bluff in an attempt to reason with her. Patsy grabbed her and tried throwing her over the edge. Instead, Patsy lost her balance and went over. Tom agrees to help her out of her predicament.

Marshall is interviewed by Judge Rogan. Marshall admits he went up to the Bluff, but insists that he found Patsy dead. Rogan says Moira was seen heading to the Bluff that day. At home, Moira tells Marshall her story. Marshall plans to confess, sparing her, but Tom invents a story to get Moira and Marshall off the hook, saying he witnessed Patsy accidentally tripping and falling from the Bluff.

When Lola visits Moira, she tells Moira her story. After leaving town, Lola ran out of money. She met Bludgeon, who worked for a cruel madame; his job was to draw women in to be taken prisoner and forced into prostitution. Lola was kept in a locked room until agreeing to become a whore. She gained Madame’s trust while plotting with Bludgeon. Lola took Madame’s money, which allowed Lola and Bludgeon to travel. After meeting Jalloux, Lola used his money to open her own brothel.

Izreel Jackson, Booger’s father, runs a negro club called the Lollypop, which hosts Madame Hortense’s traveling troupe of entertainers. Bennie wows the crowd with his dancing. When the troupe leaves town, Bennie runs away with them.

Caleb meets Young Tom. They talk about Leah Smith and Carietta’s plan to use the girl to “educate” Charles. There is talk about the wild Lottie Temple, who dreams of being on the stage. On another topic, there is no suspicion by Hazel, Carietta, or Milly that the mysterious “repaid loans” and “rents” keeping them afloat come from Tom.

Lola explains to Jed why she has sympathy for Bludgeon. He sold himself to women, making enemies. Five men tortured and emasculated him. Crawling to the brothel, Madame was willing to let him die, but Lola nursed him back to health.

Jared hatches plan to take care of Splice, who’s been force his attention on Leah. Splice asks if Jared delivered perfume to Leah on his behalf. After Splice makes sexual comments about Leah, Lottie Temple comes out of the bushes, attacking Splice. He warns her that her family better not try forcing a shotgun wedding. Milt Temple comes out of the bushes with a six-shooter, having arranged for the youngsters to be married by a parson, and the Temples leave with Splice in tow. Luella appears, having aided Jared’s scheme by getting a message to Lottie; they laugh at Splice’s plight.

Tam helps Nelia and Bessie sneak into the courtroom where divorce proceedings are underway. Jed objects to Della’s request to keep the Hadyn name, making an impassioned speech about family honor. The judge rules Della cannot use the Hadyn name. Jed’s speech has awakened a new sense of duty to family in Nelia, and Tam is hurt that she now sees things like Jed does. Determined to lose his virginity, Tam goes by the Rasczik place, where Callie Rasczik takes him to a secluded spot for sex. Later, a meeting between Jed and Lola again is interrupted by an irate Nanette Lane. Jed finds a hidden pistol on the woman.

Bennie Henderson returns to town with Madame Hortense’s troupe. At the Paradise Theater, the crowd goes wild for their hometown boy. Later, during a picnic at Marshall's cabin, Tam catches Splice trying to force himself on Leah. Leah thanks for helping her, making a veiled offer of sex.

Milly’s finances are strained after finding out who was helping and putting a stop to it. Milly is visited by Della, who’s come to say farewell before leaving town, asking to borrow Josie to help her pack. Della and Josie return to Syringa. Tom returns before Della leaves. Della sends Josie to hide, acting casual when Tom enters. Tom says he’s aware that she’s leaving, and he wants to give her something. Tom retrieves a package from the safe, handing it to her. Contrite, Della opens the package and shows him it contains a stack of paper; she’d already taken the money that was there. Tom asks if Della read the other contents of the safe; affirming that she has, she reveals she has told someone the secret she learned, saying the woman has a right to know.

Two years pass. Luella, now working for Jewel Kerens, keeps hinting at a gray and purple dress she hopes the woman will give her. It’s Juneteenth, and Luella will soon head to the park for celebrations. Jewel chastises Luella for giving Booger all of her wages. Booger arrives late to walk Luella to the park. Luella gives him a gift, a silver belt buckle with the letter “J” on it. At the park, Luella gets jealous when Booger eyes Mary Ethel Rossiter.

Charles, now employed at the bank, takes papers to Lola Wagrill that need signing. Lola tells him to have a seat while she goes inside with the papers. A woman named Sing Toy propositions Charles, telling him to come back around four o’clock, when Lola will be away. When Charles gets off work, he heads to the Choo-Choo, as Lola has renamed the brothel. Lola, still home, reprimands Sing Toy. Charles pleads to come in. Lola relents and sends for a girl. Lola has Charles wait in her bedroom as Sing Toy sneaks out of the house. Soon, Charles hears Jed down below, arguing with Lola. An angry Sing Toy told Jed Lola was seeing someone. Charles hides under the bed before Jed barges into the room. As Lola cries out in pain, Charles comes out of hiding. Jed tells Charles to leave with him, but he refuses, and Lola has sex with Charles.

While making deliveries, Tam delivers something to Nanette, who insists Tam give her a ride. When Tam sets her bag aside, he feels something inside but can’t tell what it is. Making an excuse, Tam stops to talk with Luella, telling her to get a message to Mr. Lane. Mr. Lane is waiting when they near the post office, having been warned by Luella. Tam drops them off at the river. Later, Tam thinks about the mysterious object in Nanette’s bag, realizing that it felt like a knife.

=== Book Three: Hadyn Hill ===
An ailing Nathalia is left alone with the ghosts of her past. She pictures her lost love, Abner. She still has the tail of a sorrel horse hanging on the wall, a treasured gift from him. On the question of why Abner left town and never returned to her, she prefers thinking he died in the Civil War. Jed comes to sit with her, but rushes out after seeing a fire burning in town. The Choo-Choo is on fire. Bludgeon pulls up, saying Nanette visited Lola in her bedroom before asking for a ride home. Jed and Bludgeon find Lola beneath her bed, with a knife in her back. They carry her downstairs but the ceiling falls in and the stair railing gives out. Jed wakes in Tam’s bed. Jed rushes to the Lane home and finds Bludgeon strangling Nanette. He convinces Bludgeon to let her go. Stacey left Nanette alone by the river with a promise to get a ride back. After Bludgeon brought her home, Stacey got a call from Undertaker Robards about Lola. He’d gone to the undertaker's before rushing back to find Bludgeon attacking Nanette. When Nanette recovers, she’ll be sent to an insane asylum.

Nathalia dies from a stroke. After her funeral, Moira asks Tam to drive Abner Gilgallen to the train station. While driving by Hadyn Hill, he tells Tam his story. Abner bought a sorrel mare on credit; when he couldn’t pay it off, the owner came to take it. Abner tried escaping with the horse, but had to shoot it when it suffered two broken legs, cutting off the tail as a memento and sending it to Nathalia. The outbreak of the Civil War got in the way of plans to return for the tail. Abner later moved to nearby Chalcedonia, where he’d been living for forty years. Abner asks to take the horse tail. Tam asks the man to tell him more “about her”, meaning Nathalia. Abner gives glowing praise of her – and Tam realizes the man is speaking of the horse.

Jared walks to Sironia from Chalcedonia College, reminiscing about the past two years. Jared recalls an incident the previous year, when a white mob burned down Sing Toy’s one-woman brothel before heading for the negro college. Jared tried convincing a teacher named Formsby that the white mob would leave if the students didn’t fight back. As the hard-headed Formsby prepared to attack the mob, Jared knocked him out. Jared thinks of Sironia. Luella is now married to Booger; it was a shotgun wedding after getting pregnant, though the baby died an hour after birth. Bludgeon is now an actor going by the name “Kon O’Kliffe”. Ox Pessels married Ruth. Bessie was sent to college by Milly on the understanding that she will marry Lance after graduating. Charles joined the National Guard.

Jared talks with Marshall about Lillian Lansing, who sets up shop in Lipscomb’s twice a year to sell her wares. She’s has expressed interest in Booger Jackson. Marshall summons Lillian, suggesting she leave town. Lillian refuses. She hands Marshall a note asking him to give a date and time to meet at the Hotel Sironia. Marshall hesitates, then agrees to a date.

As Tam heads out for the night, Moira sneaks out of the house. Realizes that she’s following Marshall, Tam follows them both. When Marshall enters the hotel, Tam makes an excuse about Marshall meeting salesmen at the hotel. Tam waits at the store for Marshall’s return. Tam overhears his parents arguing. Moira admits Patsy didn’t trip during a scuffle. Fearing her husband was about to commit murder, Moira tried protecting him by doing it first, flinging Patsy from the Bluff. Moira flees, killing herself by leaping from the Bluff.

Fifteen months pass. Marshall has gotten close to the widow Phronie Wills. Tam has been drafted into the Army as the country enters the First World War. Tam thinks of Milly, who has struck up an acquaintanceship with Hazel Elliott. Hazel, now married to the mill manager, works at the mill’s nursery taking care of children. Tam thinks of Kon O’Kliffe – formerly Bludgeon – whose star is rising in Hollywood. Nelia has pursued her art ambitions, setting up a studio in Jed’s old room.

At a Hadyn Hill party, Nelia tells Tam she’ll miss him when he is gone to the Army. He asks her to marry him but she says she can’t. Tam promises he’ll wait after the party to say goodbye to her but she declines the offer, telling him “this is goodbye”.

Caleb Hone drives to Syringa. Tom, in failing health, is cared for by Della. Caleb makes a report to Tom. Tam will return from the Army on the afternoon train. Focused on her art, Nelia has navigated many suitors and taken a correspondence course in Commercial Art. Charles earned a Distinguished Service Cross in the war. (Carietta died on the day of his homecoming last December.) Rogan has a successful bootlegging business, aided by Booger Jackson. Ruth has opened a gift shop in Nathalia’s old cottage. Sing Toy has broken into the movies. Caleb spoke to Charles about the need to work to pay off the Storrow debts, but Charles is unconcerned, preferring to work on a Civil War history. Rogan’s KKK-like group, the Southern Patriots, are in a steep decline, and Caleb fears they will find some cause to raise their visibility.

Tam is greeted by friends and family at the depot. Despite his wishes, there’ll be a party that evening on Thaxton Hill. Nelia introduces Tam to Doris Timkins. Marshall drives Tam to see his property near Reardon’s Pasture, now covered in a mound of clay nearly twenty feet high. Marshall means to build this up as “Lipscomb Hill”. Tam asks about the store, and Marshall says he’s hired a man named Moffatt Skine to help run the place. Marshall tells Tam to take vacation time using the traveler’s checks Marshall gave him. Ox plans on taking a road trip, but Tam declines his offer join in. When Tam picks up Nelia for the party, she again explains that she can never marry him, leading to an argument. At the party, Tam flirts with Doris Timkins, making Nelia jealous. When Tam takes Nelia home, she sits down to cry on the stairs. In the morning, Tam leaves with Ox for a road trip after all.

In her art studio in Jed’s old room, Nelia works on sketches for clothes. Bessie visits, upset because Milly wants to make an announcement for a June wedding between Bessie and Lance. To buy time, Nelia suggests Bessie agree to the marriage but ask that the announcement be put off until Milly’s Last Friday.

Meaning to spy on Booger, Luella hides near the Stag, where a meeting is taking place at the Patriots’ Hall above. Soon, Mary Ethel Rossiter walks up. As some white men come down the Patriots’ Hall stairway, Mary Ethel hides behind a barrel. The men head off, leaving Judge Rogan, Splice, and Sheriff Liggett alone. The men conspire together, though all Luella can hear is a comment about Charles before Rogan finds Mary Ethel; he and Sheriff Liggett beat her. Luella rushes into the Stag to warn Jed, and he gets the men to release Mary Ethel. Luella tells Jed the men were hatching a plot against Charles.

Nelia has made a deal with Lipscomb’s for “Hadyn Specials”, high-end products advertised with Nelia’s art that can place on special order. Krikelski, a Russian anarchist, creates the clothes Nelia designs. Tam hears an argument between his father and Moffatt Skine about the labor situation at the store, with Skine demanding guarantees for employees. On a platonic date with Tam, Nelia embraces Tam and they kiss, their clothes starting to come loose. Tam forces her arms away and gets out of the car, telling her to get dressed. He takes her home. Tam is concerned – when Nelia kissed him, he didn’t get an erection. Afraid that he may have a condition, he goes to see Doc Ball. who assures him that his case isn’t unusual. Doc Ball has a list of girls who will help patients “test” erectile issues, but Tam instead goes to see Lottie and has no trouble performing.

Tam is warned there’s trouble at the store. Tam finds his father raging in his office, having been presented with a list of labor demands. Nelia arrives, revealing that her date with him the previous night was a ploy so Skine could hold a union vote at the store. Marshall gets up on a platform to make a speech, stating that any workers who don’t agree with his ways can leave, demanding that Skine leave immediately. An altercation breaks out, and Krikelski moves to attack Tam with a crowbar. Marshall throws himself over his son, taking the blow. As Marshall lies injured, Tam addresses the employees, who seem to have been swayed to his side. Skine calmly offers his resignation.

=== Book Four: Lipscomb Hill ===
After a date with Doris Timkins, Tam meets with a drunken Splice at the store. They talk about Lottie, whose marriage to Splice was annulled. Splice reveals a plot by the Rogans are plotting to make a move against Charles regarding the Storrow properties, which Charles refuses to sell.

Booger drives Luella to their new home. Booger tosses her belongings into the dirt before taking off. Noticing some straw matting at an odd spot on the kitchen floor, she realizes it’s tacked down. Beneath the mat, she finds a door and stairs leading down to a cellar. Jared comes by, telling her Booger just wants the place as a base to sell liquor. Luella doubts this, as they are so near the police station, but Jared says the cops will be bought off with alcohol. (The exception is Officer Timkins, who’s an honest cop.)

Tam attends an opening night event at Skine’s store, where Nelia had taken employment, but is called back to the hospital. Marshall, near-delirious, tells Tam a story. Afterwards, Tam reads the documents in Marshall’s strongbox to fill in the gaps of the story. In 1861, Elijah Thaxton, then the owner of Syringa, was married to Sironia Thaxton, and Old Tom Bly was married to Sironia’s sister Chrysee, who the family had disowned for marrying their former overseer. Sironia and Chrysee fell pregnant at the same time. When Sironia went into premature labor, most of Syringa’s slaves were sent in search of a doctor, and the place was cut off from town by floodwaters. After nine days, Tempy, a slave, pushed on Sironia’s belly to relieve her suffering, and the baby came out stillborn. Under heavy sedation, Sironia begged to have her baby laid beside her. When Chrysee became aware of her sister’s condition, she made Madge, another slave, help her walk from the overseer’s cottage to the main house. Chrysee slipped and collapsed along the way, bleeding to death. Elijah stopped Tom from dashing the newborn child against the hearth, giving the child to Tempy to care for. Later, Elijah found that Tempy had given his wife Chrysee’s child, with Sironia believing it to be her own, naming the girl Millicent. Elijah and Tom made a deal to let Sironia keep the baby she believed was hers. Old Tom Bly drove a hard bargain which would see him given Syringa for a low price. Before his death, Old Tom told Young Tom the truth and charged him with helping Milly if she ever experienced hardship. With the story complete, Tam has a word with Milly. Milly reveals she was told the truth by Della when Della first left town, and that Milly herself had told Hazel. The knowledge eventually helped Milly accept Young Tom’s financial help.

Instead of leaving for a honeymoon, Tam offers to let the newlyweds stay at the Bluff cabin. Milly reveals that the wedding announcement will be followed immediately by the ceremony itself. In the kitchen, Mammy and Luella talk about Bessie, who seemed resigned to the wedding until a recent visit from Ruth. Since then, Bessie’s been hysterical, refusing to have anything to do with Josie. Checking on Bessie, Luella catches her as she’s about to drink a glass of Milly’s sleeping drops. Suspecting Bessie intends to kill herself, Luella takes the drops. Later, Luella catches Booger at the Lollypop with Mary Ethel, who is wearing Luell’as prized gray and purple dress. Luella strips the dress off of her, walloping her unconscious.

Tam wakes on the morning after the Last Friday with Bessie asleep on his arm. He tries to piece together how they got here. On Friday morning, Tam learned Ruth told Bessie about Lance’s late-night visits to Josie, upsetting her. Tam met with Bessie in the summerhouse before the party was set to begin. When Jed led Bessie to the altar, Tam stepped up next to Bessie instead of Lance, and the married Tam and Bessie. Milly did her best to hide her shock. Later, Tam met with Milly alone, explaining that when met Bessie in the summerhouse, she cried until he agreed to this plan. Tam and Bessie drove up to the cabin to spend their first wedded night together.

Luella finds Booger in bed with a thirteen-year-old girl. Booger invites Luella to beat the young girl, but a sympathetic Luella tells the girl to leave. From then on, Luella is a changed person, her spirit broken. One night, Luella launches into a verbal attack on Booger, threatening to snitch about his illegal activities. Booger beats her, threatening to bust out her teeth, her one vanity. In the morning, he hints that he might take Luella out on the town, telling her to prepare her gray and purple dress. When he’s gone, Luella finds Booger has slashed the dress to pieces. Pushed too far, Luella gets word to Officer Timkins about the liquor.

After a visit from Ruth, Bessie, pregnant now, is hysterical. Bessie says Ruth warned her that Tam was planning on having a “meeting” with Lillian Lansing. Nelia visits Tam at the store. He insists Bessie agreed to let him have dalliances. Desperate, Nelia makes a bet with Jed that he can’t get Lillian to break a date to go out with him. The gambit works. Later, Nelia goes to the hospital to find Marshall has died. Tam is ashamed that he might’ve been off with Lillian when his father died. Tam stands out on a porch with Milly, who reveals a secrets: she still wears a heart locket with Marshal’s initials on them that he gave her on the day of her wedding to Calvin.

Rogan has influenced things so Booger will only spend one year in state prison. Booger requests to see Luella before leaving for the penitentiary. Luella goes to the depot. Booger begs for one last kiss; Luella can’t resist, running to Booger with tears in her eyes. With his one free hand, Booger punches her in the mouth, sending her to the ground and breaking her teeth.

Caleb Hone meets with Charles, requesting that he run for a vacant congressional seat against Oscar Rogan. Charles declines. Later, Splice pays a visit, attempting to discourage Charles from running for office by threatening to spread nasty rumors. Angry, Charles decides to run.

Bennie’s troupe arrives in town. Jared talks to Bennie, asking him to put in some money so the grandchildren can build Mammy a new cabin. Bennie gives Jared a thousand dollars, which Jared buries in the corn crib. Leah warns Jared of a plan by Rogan to start trouble at the troupe’s after-hours performance at a club called the Blues Chaser. Jared rushes to Tam, who requests some cops be sent to keep an eye on things. With his mind at ease, Jared returns to the Paradise, where Leah is waiting in the alley. She says Bennie was showing off to Booger Jackson (back from prison), bragging about the money he gave Jared.

Jared is awakened by a scared Bennie. After the performance at the Blues Chaser, Lottie came to his room to ask about dance steps. As she showed him a step, she tripped and fell out an open window. Josie comes to stay with the family as Jared takes Bennie to Tam’s house. Tam calls Constable Gates, who says Lottie is still alive. Together, they drive to the Temple home, hoping Tam can get a statement from Lottie confirming Bennie’s story. Bennie panics, telling the truth: he was getting sexual with Lottie; when her friends started banging on the door, she tried climbing out, falling instead. Gates takes him to jail. Jared gets to the Square to find an angry mob. A cattle truck pulls up with the Hendersons in the back. Jared overhears that the Henderson home was burned down. The mob piles firewood in the stone basin of the fountain. A "committee" tries entering the jail but Tam and Constable Gates guard the entrance. Oscar Rogan makes a speech, whipping up the mob. Tom Bly, having been driven there by Della, speaks up to oppose him but is drowned out by the crowd. The mob rushes inside the jailhouse to get Bennie. When Mammy calls out to him, she is beaten. Jared joins his family in the truck. Bennie is led thorough town in chains, is clothes slashed off and strips of skin ripped off of him. Back at the Square. Bennie shrieks when he sees the basin piled with mesquite, which burns slower and hotter than other wood. Rogan and Milt Temple try forcing Lottie to throw a torch on the woodpile, but Lottie breaks free. Booger Jackson throws a torch instead. Bennie cries out in pain; Booger Jackson cries out in triumph. As Bennie writhes in the flames, Tom Bly carefully takes aim with a pistol and fires, putting Bennie out of his misery before swaying and collapsing. Della heads for Doc Ball, who declares Tom dead. Della takes Lottie to Syringa.

As daylight breaks, Jared carries Bennie’s corpse to the negro undertaker, who helps him do a quick burial next to Lilybeth's grave. That night, Jared sleeps in the corn crib. He is woken by voices outside, realizing they belong to Booger and Luella. Booger tries getting Luella to be more specific about where the money is buried. Jared calls out; Booger answers back, asking him to come out and talk. Luella grabs hold of Booger's shotgun when Jared rushes out. Jared chases after Booger, but Luella trips Jared and Booger gets away.

A list is drawn up of nearly five hundred Reardon County citizens, who are charged with various crimes relating to the lynching. The next day, a sham trial is held whereby they are acquitted of all charges. Having been acquitted, they can never be charged again due to double jeopardy laws.

After a meal at Thaxton Manor, Tam is shown Tom Bly's will. The bulk of the considerable Bly estate has been left to Milly. Tam sees Lillian Lansing at a coffee shop. She relays the information that Della and Lottie are headed for Los Angeles, where Lottie will be Kon O'Kliffe's protégé. At home, he and Bessie talk about Booger who, rumor has it, is Oscar Rogan's bastard son.

Dal Nordstrom drives to Sironia despite Lillian breaking their date, suspicious that she is seeing another man. When he checks on her, Dal sees a man jump out of bed with a white hood over his head. Dal is knocked unconscious. Later, Lillian says a stranger broke in and tried raping her. Lillian calls Tam, who arrives with Constable Gates. Neither Dal nor Lillian can identify the assailant, but Dal says it was a light-skinned black man. Dal suggests the assailant might’ve been Jared, but Lillian says she would’ve recognized Jared’s voice. When Constable Gates plans to question Jared, Lillian suggests it may have been Booger. Rumor spreads that Rogan is sheltering Booger.

Tam gets a frantic message from Nelia. Ruth asked to borrow her car, and is now headed to Chalcedonia to be married to Lance by a revival preacher. They hurry to Chalcedonia, getting there just in time. Tam goes to Thaxton Hill to warn Milly about Ruth, but Nelia has already done so. Tam tells a shocked Milly about Lance and Josie. Milly goes upstairs to wake Lance. Lance comes down and heads out the back way. Soon, the returns with Josie and two children. Milly studies the children, recognizing Thaxton-like features on their mulatto faces. Milly tells them to leave and slams the door. Later, she asks Tam to bring Lance back so she can tell him she will no longer try to force marriage on him.

Tam gets wind of a Rogan plot concerning a longstanding rumor that Carietta and Webley Storrow weren’t married when she got pregnant. The Rogan plan is that Charles will be forced to challenge Splice to a fight that Splice will win, making Charles look weak in the eyes of voters. Tam speaks with Jared, who warns that Charles plans to confront Splice at his office. Tam goes to see Splice, but is are too late. Charles, already there, challenges Splice to a fight. Despite expectations that Splice would beat Charles easily, Charles wins the fight. Splice retracts his statements.

Milly invites Tam and Bessie to wait with the family for the primary results to come in. Alone with Tam, Milly says she wants Tam to act as her executor when she is gone. With her debts paid off, the remainder of the estate will go to Lance. Milly gives a recountal of when she, at sixteen, eavesdropped with a nineteen-year-old Marshall Lipscomb as her family debated sending her away to a girls’ school to separate them. In the end, she’d married Calvin instead of going away. The results come in; Charles has won the Democratic primary.

Jared shows Tam a burned slip of paper found in Mammy's stove. The letter was written to Luella, asking her to bring food to someone. They drive out to spy on Rogan’s barn. They see Luella go into the barn with food; when she comes out, she looks dejected. Tam and Jared search the barn and find the food, as well as a floor-pallet and a jacket. As Tam drives Jared home, they discuss Lillian, who rents the old Lipscomb home. Mrs. Huggins, a neighbor, has reported having seen men slinking around. Milly phones, requesting to see Tam. He drops Bessie off at Ruth’s shop and heads for Thaxton Hill. Milly relays the news that Lottie Temple has married Kon O'Kliffe. They talk about the rumor that Rogan will run against Charles as a Republican. Tam mentions Lillian Lansing, and Milly has Tam drive her to pay a surprise visit to the woman. Tam suggests Lillian go back out on the road, but Lillian is defiant. A woman calls Lillian's phone, asking about Tam before hanging up. A taxi pulls up. Tam goes out to see an angry Bessie exiting the cab; she trips and falls, screaming in pain. Tam notices that she is bleeding profusely. Doc Ball arrives. He tells Tam that it's a breech birth, and Tam must make a decision on which he should try to save, Bessie or the baby. Tam chooses Bessie. Later, Tam is allowed to see Bessie. Against Tam's wishes, Bessie insisted that the babies – twin boys – be saved. She says she called Mrs. Huggins to ask about baby things, and the woman told her about Tam's car being at Lillian's. Bessie made Ruth call to confirm Tam was there before rushing over. She wishes for him to marry Nelia after she dies, but she guesses they never will. Bessie dies. Soon, Lillian leaves town.

After Nelia's return to Sironia. Tam learns of yet another Rogan plot. The next time Charles goes up to Leah's room, Rogan’s men will catch him in the act. Tam talks with Leah, telling her about the plot. Tam responds to a panicked call from Callie Rasczik. When he picks her up, Callie has him drive her near the skating rink. She was walking this way when she was attacked by a man who raped her. Knowing her reputation in town, she called Tam. They find the assailant’s hat and take it to Constable Gates. With Callie’s description, and initials in the hat that look like "B.J.", Gates guesses the attacker was Booger Jackson. More women come forward; one of them claims the attacker had a belt buckle with an initial on it that might have been a “J”.

Jared comes to Tam with a plot to counter Rogan, conceived by Della. Certain that Ruth is the one tipping off Rogan’s men, they’ll make it look like Charles is going up to Leah’s room; when Rogan’s goons bust into the room, Jared will drop down the vines outside the window, giving Tam a chance to take photographs from cover. Thus, they will have proof it was Jared with Leah, and Rogan’s men will be guilty of breaking and entering. On the night when the plan is to go down, Della calls the “tip” in herself, imitating Ruth. Tam sees a man sneaking into the house, assuming it’s Jared. Rogan’s men show up and enter the house. Tam watches as a man climbs out the window. Tam snaps a photo and in the glare of the camera flash sees that it’s Splice. Tam hides the film in the hayloft and climbs out the back, circling around to come to the front of the house. Tam tells the men they’ve broken the law and the photographic evidence is safe. Tam explains that the film will only be used if Rogan continues using dirty tricks.

Caleb writes a letter to a homesick Lottie, filling her in on town gossip. He tells of the trick played on Splice with Leah, including a fact Splice doesn’t know: Tam’s picture didn’t come out, and would’ve been useless. Rogan is now concentrating on local politics. Caleb talks about Nelia, who rejected a proposal from Skine.

Bat and Patricia take Tam to the Blues Chaser, where they find Nelia on a date with Splice. When Jed shows up in search of Nelia, she and Splice make a quick getaway in his car. Nelia tries putting an end to Splice’s hopes of marriage. Splice insults her as a whore, pulling into Reardon’s Pasture and finding a parking spot. Splice figures that, if he rapes her, the family won’t allow a scandal; with her being “tainted”, she’ll have to marry him. Splice forces her into the rumble seat, tearing her clothes. As they struggle, Nelia watches as someone slams a piece of limestone down on Splice’s head. Splice calls out for Booger not to hit him before passing out. Splice is flung back and the Cat Man, with a hood over his head, reaches for Nelia. She struggles with him, pulling off his hood. When Nelia sees who it is, she screams.

Nelia arrives at Tam’s home. As they rush to the hospital, she tells him what happened. To avoid a scandal, Tam drops her off. Tam tells Dot Rasczik a story about responding when hearing a scream from the Pasture and finding Splice with a girl who wants to remain anonymous. He says Splice identified the attacker as Booger Jackson. Tam picks Nelia up, telling her Splice is alive but unconscious, and he drops her off at Hadyn Hill. Tam tries to sleep, but is startled awake by Jared, who is holding a shotgun. Tam opines that Rogan and his men will rampage against the town’s negroes. Jared says he knows where Booger’s hiding, and that he’s going to shoot him, making it look like a suicide, which will be more merciful than a lynching. Jared tells Tam to come to the river when he hears a shotgun blast. Jared embraces Tam, asking to use Tam’s kitchen table. Dot calls, saying Splice is dead and the Judge is organizing a mob. Tam hears a shotgun blast. He goes to the river and finds a body with its face blown off. The dead man is wearing Booger’s belt buckle. Tam phones Gates. In the morning, Tam calls Constable Gates. Tam is shocked when Gates says the girl with Splice has signed an affidavit, but is relieved when Gates reveals the girl is Leah. Tam goes to Mammy’s house and asks about Jared, but Jared never returned home. Tam goes to Hadyn Hill, speaking with Leah, who says Nelia is near a nervous breakdown; Leah and Nelia will leave for Washington, where Nelia will spend some time in a sanitarium. Jed leaves with Della and Doris to visit Kon in Hollywood.

At his office, Tam finds an envelope containing several letters written by Jared. In the letters, Jared talks about his feelings towards whitefolks changing after the lynching. He started an affair with Lillian, wearing a white hood in case he was seen by others. After knocking out Dal Nordstrom, Lillian told Jared she’d identified Booger to protect him, but would have to tell the truth if Booger were caught. He confesses to tricking Tam that day at the Rogan barn. Tam reads the last two letters, both dated in the early morning hours of July 31. In the first, Jared tells of attacking Splice, saying he’ll never forget Nelia’s scream when she and Jared recognized each other. He finishes this letter by guessing Tam knows the truth by now, saying he will bring a shotgun so that Tam can kill him. The final letter, written at Tam’s kitchen table, says that when Tam finds the body, it will be dressed in Booger’s clothes, but the body will be Jared’s. Booger has been dead since the night he tried stealing the money from the corn crib; though he’d initially gotten away, Jared waited until Booger broke from cover, chasing him down and beating him to death with a log.

To explain Jared’s disappearance, Tam makes up a lie about Jared seeking employment out of state. Tam meets with Lillian, who’s back in town; she leases the old house with an option to buy. Oscar Rogan leaves politics for good. Tam learns that Leah is considering marriage to a nightclub m.c. and a congressman who thinks Leah is white. At home, Lance brings his children by twice a week to see Milly.

Milly Thaxton dies on November 19, 1921. It falls to Tam to inform Lance. When Tam tells Lance Milly had to “leave” without saying goodbye, Lance corrects him, saying she did say goodbye. Josie explains that at around five-thirty, Lance had spoken aloud, saying “Goodbye, mother.” When asked, Lance told her he’d heard Milly saying, “Goodbye, my sweet boy.” The whole town grieves, forgetting that, by the time of her death, Milly had been largely ignored. With Nelia being busy, it’s not until the afternoon of the funeral that Tam is finally able to see her. Nelia has decided to marry Charles. She says the time of the Hill Families is over, and it’s people like Tam who will be the future of Sironia. Nelia worries that, if they were to marry, in time Tam would feel she was using her Hill Family background against him, and there’d be times when he was right. Eventually, they would both say and do things they couldn’t take back. Frustrated, Tam drives to the old place for a tryst with Lillian.

Tam thinks about all the people he’s known who’ve had troubles, about Trina, and about the revelation, upon going through her things after her death, that Miss Nathalia had saved a newspaper clipping about Arthur Gilgallen settling down in Chalcedonia, proving she’d known for decades how little she’d really meant to him. He thinks about how Milly and Hazel’s relationship had changed so much over time, and about Della Kolchak having become one of the most dependable people he knows. He thinks about Lola Wagrill, Luella, Bennie, and Jared, feeling that he shouldn’t feel self-pity. He thinks about his mother, wishing she’d been able to see she’d only done what was necessary. He heads for a lunch date with Charles and Nelia. Tam is told Nelia and Charles are running late as he is seated alone at a table. Doris arrives, expecting to have lunch alone with Charles and Nelia. They realize Nelia has conspired to bring them together. Doris talks about the goings-on in Hollywood. There was a blackmail attempt, initiated by Sing Toy, over Kon’s physical status. The blackmail failed when Lottie became pregnant with Kon’s baby. (Jed is the real father.) They talk about Milly’s keepsakes. Tam plans to bury the locket with Milly.

As Tam arrives at Thaxton Hill, he admires the beauty of the house as it is all lit up. He wishes he could snap a photo, as he may never see it this way again. After many rejected offers to buy the Hill, and many discarded plans, the Lipscom/Balcom plan has won out: The Hill will be leveled, the dirt used to build the riverbank above flood stage and to heighten Lipscomb Hill. Inside, Tam learns that Luella, after being miserable upon learning of Booger’s suicide, is improving, happy with the new teeth Tam bought her. Nelia points out that it is the last Friday of November. She is exhausted from trying to coach Lance to choose the first item she touches, one of the more valuable pieces. The choosing of keepsakes is set to begin, the relatives being allowed in and Lance coming to stand near Tam. Lance whispers to Tam that Josie is expecting, and if it’s a boy, they plan on naming it “Tam’. Nelia tells Lance to choose his keepsake. He seems unfocused as she touches the piece of jewelry she wants him to take. When she reminds him why he’s here, to choose the one item he would like, he makes his choice: the lawnmower.

== Characters ==
=== Main characters ===
- Marshall Lipscomb: Husband of Moira and father of Tam. Owner of Lipscomb's Store, a successful store passed down from his father. He and Millie Thaxton fell in love in their youth, but she married the family-approved Calvin Thaxton.
- Moira Lipscomb: Left the Catholic Church when she married Marshall, becoming a Baptist. Has suffered through many of her husband's affairs.
- Tammas Abercrombie (Tam) Lipscomb: Five years old at the outset of the story. Headstrong, he maintains a crush on Nelia Hadyn throughout the story.
- Milicent Letitia (Milly) Thaxton: The unofficial leader of the Hill Families, and a force to be reckoned with. In denial about the intellectual disabilities of her son, Lance, who she spends years trying to arrange a marriage for. Her true parentage is revealed over the course of the story.
- Carietta Cahoon Storrow: Milly's cousin, and mother of Charles, who she is overprotective of.
- Charles Storrow: Close in age to Tam. Throughout the story, he develops feelings for both Nelia Hadyn and Leah Smith.
- Jed Hadyn: Older brother of Nelia. The Hadyn parents are both dead, leaving Jed to raise his sister, and he is overprotective of her. A heavy drinker and serial womanizer.
- Cornelia (Nelia) Hadyn: Three years old at the beginning if the story. Has feelings for Tam but resists a relationship due to feelings of family pride and responsibility.

=== Secondary characters ===
- Launcelot (Lance) Thaxton: Nineteen at the beginning of the story. Intellectually slow, but kind to everyone. He has no interest in the white girls his mother tries pairing him with, preferring black servant Josie.
- Hazel Elliott: Estranged half-sibling of Young Tom Bly and wife of Bill Elliott, an ex-circus roustabout who's made a fortune.
- "Young" Tom Bly: A wealthy lecher whose behavior meets with the disapproval of many. The half-brother of Hazel.
- Nathalia Storrow: Elderly Hill Family cousin. Treasures a horsetail given to her by her great lost love, Abner Gilgallen, believed to be dead. Throughout the story, she sends new chapters of a neverending memoir called "Growing Up with Sironia" to the local paper, with the chapters published when the paper has space to fill.
- Trina Storrow: Orphaned when young, she lives in a cabin near Storrow Manor with Nathalia. Plain and unattractive, she has feelings for Jed. Jed only marries her to get out of a jam, and has many affairs.
- Jared Henderson: Grandson of Mammy, the result of a relationship between Lilybeth Henderson and Bill Elliott.
- Luella Henderson: Granddaughter of Mammy. She spends years in an abusive relationship with Booger Jackson, the illegitimate son of Oscar Rogan.
- Bennie Henderson: Grandson of Mammy, and the youngest of Lilybeth's children. His dancing and physical antics win him notice. Runs away with a negro performance troupe at the age of fourteen, returning years later with disastrous consequences.
- Leah Smith: The result of an unapproved marriage between Pieter Hadyn and a biracial woman. Born with the name Bijou, she was renamed when her parents died and she was given to Mammy Henderson to raise.
- Della Kolchak: A waitress with whom Jed Hadyn cheats on Trina, becoming his second wife. After their divorce, she becomes a paramour of Young Tom. Initially hated by most members of the Hill Families, many in the family come to respect her.
- Laurine Lane / Lola Wagrill: Laurine flees Sironia after a relationship with Jed and an argument with her spiteful mother. While away, she becomes a prostitute and then brothel madame under the name Lola Wagrill, later returning to Sironia to run the local whorehouse.
- Bessie Hicks: Hill Family relative who comes to live in Sironia. Has a crush on both Tam and Charles. As she gets older, Milly tries forcing a marriage between Bessie and Lance.
- Oscar Rogan: A judge who serves as mayor of Sironia for a time. His wife, Selma, is a lower-tier relative of the Hill Families. Mixes his legit work with illegal work like bootlegging.
- Splice Rogan: Cruel son of Oscar. Near Tam's age, his family tries arranging a marriage between him and Nelia so they can get their hands on Hill Family property and prestige.
