= Madison Cooper =

American businessman and philanthropist

Madison Alexander Cooper Jr., (June 3, 1894 – September 28, 1956) was an American businessman and philanthropist from Waco, Texas, who is best remembered for his long novel Sironia, Texas (1952), which made publishing history at that time as the longest novel in English originally published in book form, in two volumes totaling 1,731 pages, and containing an estimated 840,000 words.

== Life and career ==
Cooper was born in Waco, and was the son of Madison Alexander and Martha Dillon (Roane) Cooper. The youngest of three, he had two elder sisters, Lucile and Christine; the latter died the year of his birth. A good student, he chose to attend the University of Texas at Austin, graduating in 1915 with a degree in English; while at the university he was a member of Sigma Alpha Epsilon fraternity. Upon his graduation Cooper returned to Waco to work in the family grocery business, the M. A. Cooper Company, before attending officer's training camp in Leon Springs, and serving as a lieutenant and captain for the U.S. Army in World War I. Returning to Texas after the war, he worked for the family business for a decade before striking out on his own in various business pursuits.

Cooper began his literary activities as a writer of short stories in the 1920s under the pseudonym Matt Cooper, selling a few; in the following decade he took three correspondence courses in writing via Columbia University, where his professors suggested his style was more suited to the writing of a novel. His mother died in 1939, and his father followed her in 1940; Cooper took possession of the family home after their deaths and remained there for the rest of his life, accompanied only by the longtime family servant, Bertha Lee Walton. He converted the attic into a writing space, and spent much of his time there; it remains today as he left it after his death. Cooper offered the house to the USO during World War II, and hosted many servicemen there through the duration of the war.

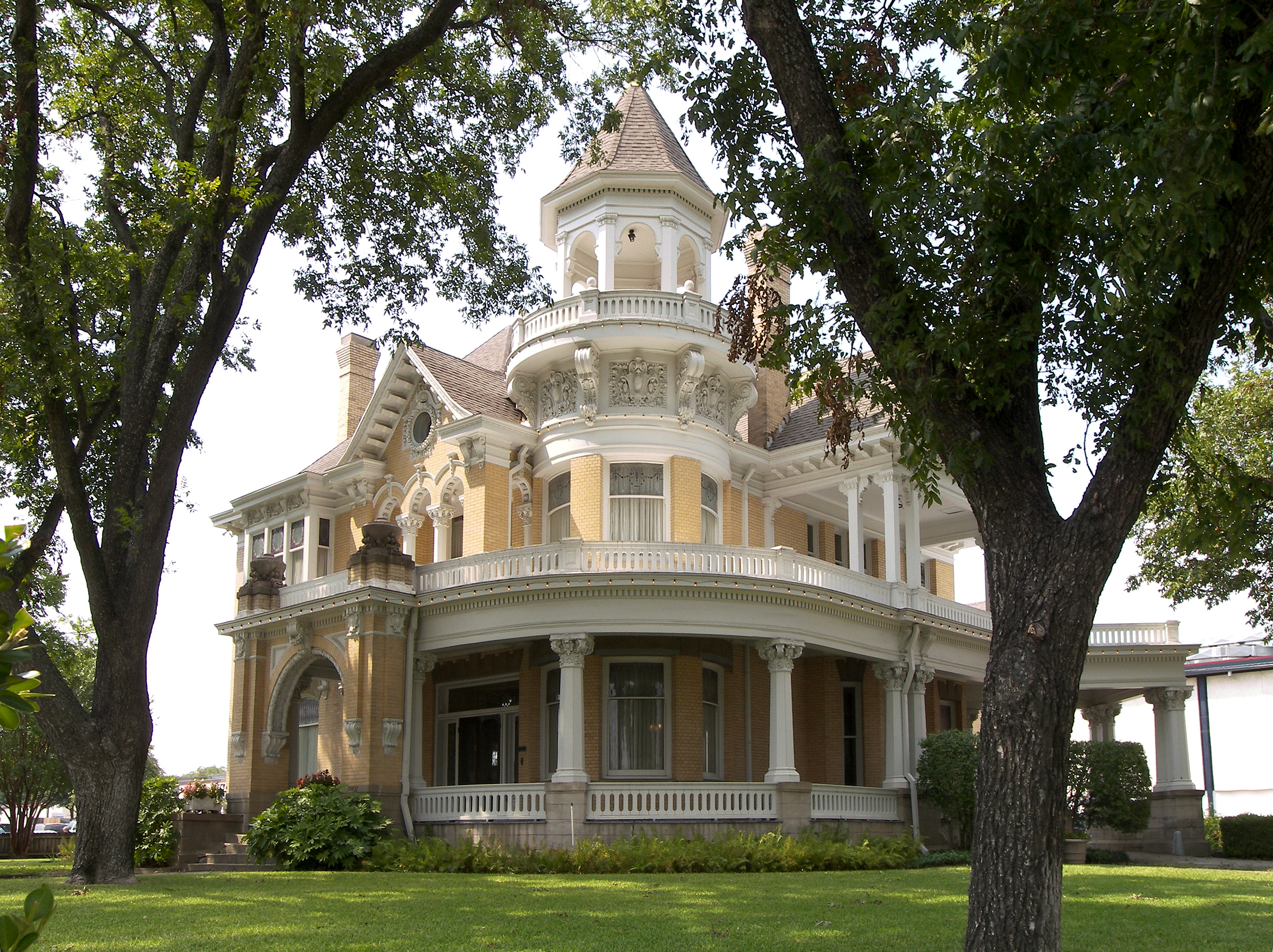
The Madison Cooper House in 2008.

Cooper soon developed a reputation as a wealthy and eccentric bachelor among members of the local community. He grew ever more reclusive, withdrawing more and more from society; famously, he would limit his time with visitors to his house by using a kitchen timer. He cut an unusual figure around town, wearing a pair of baggy khaki pants; an old flannel shirt; an old sweater; and shoes which had seen frequent repair. He carried his business papers in a battered leather briefcase, and was seldom without a list of books to be checked out from the library on the way home.

Cooper never revealed his literary ambitions to anyone, and it came as a great surprise to many people when Houghton Mifflin published Sironia, Texas in 1952. Cooper wrote much of the draft of the novel on used carbon paper. Sironia, Texas was set in a fictional Texas town which appeared to be based on Waco; many of the characters were known to have been based in some part on local personalities, but to what extent Cooper would never admit. The book, an extension of a theme first developed in his 1939 short story "The Catch of Sironia", remained on the New York Times Bestseller List for eleven weeks, and won him a 1952 Houghton Mifflin Literary Fellowship; it has been noted that he purchased a Brooks Brothers suit to attend the fellowship ceremony. He also received McMurray Bookshop Award, granted in 1953 by the Texas Institute of Letters; he used the money to set up a fund for needy writers. The book sold for $10 at the time of publication; this, coupled with the fact that Cooper refused to entertain options for foreign distribution, soon led to its falling out of favor.

Cooper wrote one additional novel, The Haunted Hacienda (1955), which did not fare as well as Sironia, Texas; it was the first in a planned trilogy, but the other two books were never written. Cooper also wrote book reviews for the Dallas Morning News.

Cooper had remained employed by the Cooper Company for much of his life, rising in 1947 to the position of vice-president. He attempted to leverage his new position to impose changes upon the company, which were resisted by many other members of the firm. Eventually he acquiesced to a buyout, and in 1954 the company became the J. R. Milan Company, rechristened in honor of its new president.

Cooper died in Waco, suffering a heart attack while seated at the wheel of his Packard in the parking lot of Waco Municipal Stadium soon after finishing his thrice-weekly mile-long constitutional run around the stadium track. He was buried at Oakwood Cemetery, with Presbyterian rites; his will directed that his literary files be burned, unread, upon his death, and further requested the destruction of any papers that might be found to compromise his many female acquaintances.

== Philanthropy ==
Cooper began his philanthropic activities, often anonymous, around 1924, and continued them for the remainder of his life. He began with small gifts, often no greater than $50, to the local community chest and other organizations, including his alma mater; he also provided loans to local students he felt were worthy of financial backing. Cooper set up the Madison Alexander Cooper and Martha Roane Cooper Foundation in honor of his parents in 1943; with the stated goal "to make Waco a better place in which to live", it gave out its first grant, $100 for the Waco Fire Department, three years later. At his death he left his entire estate, totaling $3 million, to the Foundation, directing that it should be used for the betterment of life in Waco; his house was also left to the Foundation as a headquarters building, with the stipulation that Bertha Walton be allowed to remain in the house as caretaker. He also stated that no member of his family should be allowed to serve on the Foundation board, or have a say in the use of its money, until 2000. The Foundation has since meted out grants totaling over $20 million for various projects around Waco, and Cooper's name has been said to have become "part of the civic landscape".

Cooper also supported Texas A&M University with the gift of a dairy farm he owned, donated to the university to provide an experimental demonstration farm to be used by the farmers of Central Texas.

== Honors ==
The terminal building at Waco Regional Airport is named in Cooper's honor, as is a community clinic in Waco.

The Madison Cooper House was listed on the National Register of Historic Places in 1982.
