= Jane Freeman (artist) =

British-American painter

Jane Freeman (1871 – 23 September 1963) was a British-American modernist artist whose paintings include portraits of Albert Schweitzer and Mother Cabrini. Her art is part of the collections of the University of Pennsylvania and the Springville, Utah Museum of Art.

== Biography ==
Freeman was born in Chesterfield, England. She began as an artist's model, then found work as an illustrator for magazines and advertisements. Soon after she became a painter. She studied art with Robert Henri at the Cooper Union and with the Art Students League, both in New York, as well as with William Merritt Chase and with Olga Boznańska in Paris. She spent most of her career in New York, primarily painting portraits and teaching. In the summers, she regularly took part in the artist colonies at Provincetown, Massachusetts, and Rockport, Maine. Her love of travel took her further afield, to Europe, Morocco, and—for an extended period—the Caribbean island of Trinidad. She was a suffragist like her younger sister, Elisabeth Freeman.

Freeman died at the Meyer's Sanitarium in Park Ridge, New Jersey.

In 2011, the Cooperative Gallery in Binghamton, New York, curated a retrospective exhibition of her work, entitled “Art, Money, Love: Jane Freeman, 1871-1963, Paintings and Ephemera of a Working Artist.”
