= Everard W. Daniel =

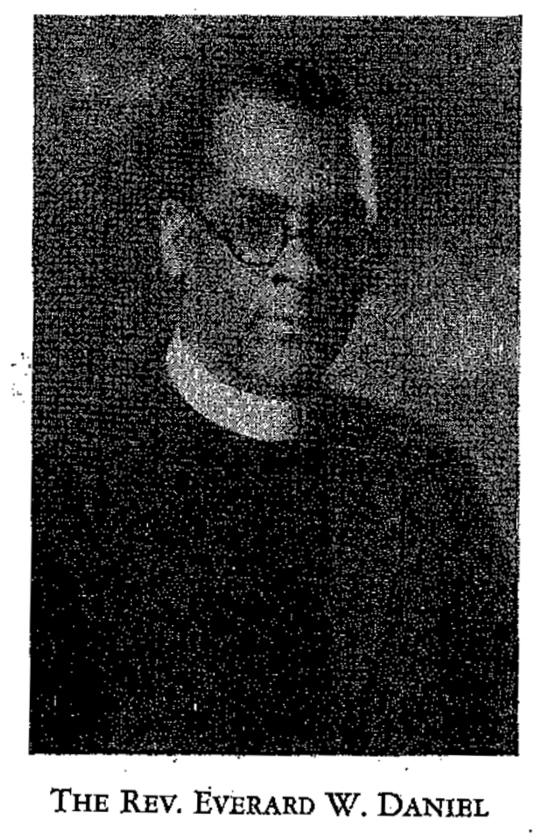
- Official photo of the Reverend Everard W. Daniel, Episcopal minister
- Born: 1876; Saint Thomas, Danish West Indies
- Died: 6 September 1939 (aged 62–63); Detroit, Michigan
- Occupation: Minister in the Episcopal Church

The Reverend Father Everard W. Daniel (1876-September 6, 1939) was an Episcopal minister and community activist. He served at St. Philip's Church in New York City, where he was an influential athletic director in youth sports. In Detroit, he served as Rector for St. Matthew's Church. He worked with the likes of Henry Ford to attain gainful employment for his parishioners. He often worked with organizations like the NAACP.

== Early life ==
Rev. Daniel was the son of Joseph and Clementine Daniel, born in what is now the Virgin Islands. Though the exact time that he arrived in the United States is not known, we know that he attended St. Augustine College in Raleigh, North Carolina, followed by New York University. He became a deacon in 1901, and was promoted to the Priesthood in 1902. The following year, in 1903, he married Marceline Munday. The couple had one son, who they named Langton. Initially, Father Daniel served in a church in Minneapolis, Minnesota. In 1905, he was called back to New York City to serve as the first curate of St. Philip's Church. He would remain at this post for 16 years. A church biography from 1943 recalls his time there:

"[The Reverend Daniel was] not only one of the most brilliant and energetic priests that the Parish has ever had, but his work among the young people...attract[ed] nation-wide attention. True, his work was largely of a social nature, and the nature of that work was...later to change quite radically,...nevertheless, it remained for many years the most outstanding piece of work, certainly among Negro churches in the country."

== St. Christopher Club at St. Philip's Church ==
His work with the youth in the community largely centered around a church-sponsored athletic organization that he led called St. Christopher Club. The club supported various types of athletics, but they were well known for their basketball team, nicknamed the St. C's. At the time, St. Philip's was located in the black section of town called "The Tenderloin" (currently the East Village). There were many opportunities to explore the vices of the day in the neighborhood. Reverend Daniel organized the St. Christopher Club as a means of keeping young Black men out of what had come to be known as "Satan's Circus". He taught the principles of amateurism to his athletes. On the court, they were an imposing force, winning Colored Basketball World Championships in 1914, and 1917–1919.

== Education ==
The Reverend Daniel returned to school to further his education in about 1910. Having previously earned his B.S. and M.A. degrees from NYU, he also received his Bachelor of Sacred Theology from General Theological Seminary in 1912, and Bachelor of Divinity from Union Theological Seminary in 1913.

== Silent Parade ==
In July 1917, his church, St. Philip's, was the site of the planning committee for the historic Negro Silent Protest Parade. He worked with the NAACP and a host of other church leaders to define a response to atrocities like those regularly experienced by Black people, most recently in East St. Louis, Waco, and Memphis.

== St. Matthew's Church ==
He left New York in 1921, when he became Rector of St. Matthew's Church in Detroit, Michigan. The church was in his care for the next 18 years. He worked to improve conditions for his parishioners socially, and economically. Still, his was not one of the largest congregations in the city, rather it was made up of Blacks in the city who could appreciate East-coast-raised Daniel. Author Beth Thompkins Bates in The Making of Black Detroit in the Age of Henry Ford states:

"While [fellow Detroit clergyman] Rev. Bradby's church was thought of as the "church for the laboring masses", Father Daniel's church, pastured by black Detroit's most educated minister, addressed a smaller congregation that was considered a "church for the classes."

== Relationship with Ford Motor Company ==
Henry Ford, founder of the Ford Motor Company, was a shrewd business man, and did not let race get in the way of a profitable decision. In 1923, Ford started a program to recruit Negro workers. He worked with local church leaders, including Reverend Daniel to refer men in need of jobs to the Ford offices. While some of the Reverend Daniel's parishioners did work in menial or dangerous jobs at the factory, Ford was a progressive organization. Parishioners had the opportunity to work "on the assembly line, in laboratories, in skilled trades, and could be promoted to foreman". Reverend Daniel did not operate in a bubble, and he understood the influence his role in the community brought to the Church. It was known that "a recommendation from [fellow clergyman] Bradby or Daniel was tantamount to joining Ford's payroll".

== Death ==
Reverend Daniel died in service to Detroit's St. Matthew's Episcopal Church on September 6, 1939. He was 63 years old. His wife, Marceline, and their son, Langton, survived him.
