= George Frazier Miller =

American religious leader and activist (1864–1943)

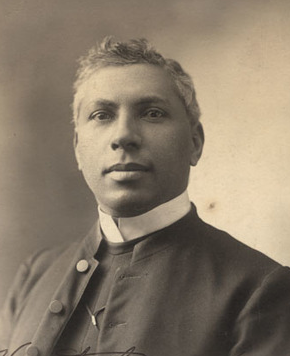
- Miller in the 1910s

Personal details
- Born: November 28, 1864 Aiken, South Carolina, C.S.
- Died: May 9, 1943 (aged 78) New York City, U.S.
- Party: Socialist
- Spouse: Ellen Bulkley Miller
- Children: 3
- Relatives: Richard Edward Dereef (grandfather)
- Education: Howard University (BA); General Theological Seminary; New York University

George Frazier Miller (November 28, 1864 – May 9, 1943) was an American religious official and activist. A member of the Episcopal Church, he served as a rector for 47 years and was a founding member of the Niagara Movement.

Born in Aiken, South Carolina, when Miller was six his father died and his grandfather, Richard Edward Dereef, helped raise him. Educated at Howard University, General Theological Seminary, and New York University, he was ordained in the Episcopal Church in 1891 and became a rector in 1896.

Miller was a friend of W. E. B. Du Bois and was among the founders of the Niagara Movement in 1906. He was a Socialist candidate for United States House of Representatives in 1918. He was a member of two delegations to President Woodrow Wilson, one requesting that lynching become a federal crime and the other requesting that clemency be given to members of the 24th Infantry Regiment in relation to the Houston riot of 1917.

== Early life ==
George Frazier Miller was born in Aiken, South Carolina, on November 28, 1864, as the youngest of six children. When Miller was six his father died and he was raised by his mother and grandfather, Richard Edward Dereef. Miller fathered three children with Ellen Bulkley Miller, who died on October 15, 1923.

Miller graduated from Howard University with a Bachelor of Arts degree in 1888, General Theological Seminary in 1891, and New York University. On May 24, 1891, Miller was ordained in the Episcopal Church. In 1912, Howard University gave him an honorary degree of Doctor of Divinity.

== Career ==
Starting in 1896, Miller served as the rector of St. Augustine's Church in Brooklyn, New York City, until his death. In 1924, he was responsible for obtaining the church's new building. He became a senior clergyman in the Episcopal Diocese of Long Island and a trustee of Howard University. Miller was elected president of the National Equal Rights League.

On August 1, 1917, Miller was a member of a delegation of prominent black leaders that presented a petition to President Woodrow Wilson asking for him to support legislation to make lynching a federal crime. This delegation included Everard W. Daniel, James Weldon Johnson, John E. Nail, Fred R. Moore, Madam C. J. Walker, and chaired by Frederick Asbury Cullen. However, Wilson refused to meet with them with his secretary, Joseph Patrick Tumulty, saying that Wilson was too busy.

Cullen, Johnson, and Miller were members of a delegation to Wilson in 1918, that presented a petition signed by 12,000 people asking for clemency for members of the 24th Infantry Regiment given the death sentence for the Houston riot of 1917. After this meeting Wilson stopped all executions of soldiers except for those at the front in World War I and later commuted 10 of the 16 death sentences.

Miller was a friend of W. E. B. Du Bois, a founding member of the Niagara Movement, member of the NAACP, and contributor to The Messenger. In 1906, Miller joined the Socialist Party of America and was its candidate for the New York's 21st congressional district in 1918, during which he raised and spent $10 (equivalent to $214 in 2025). He received 5.1% of the vote as incumbent Democrat Jerome F. Donovan was re-elected. He called for the release of Earl Browder.

On May 9, 1943, Miller died in Brooklyn and was succeeded as rector by Charles C. E. England.

== Works ==
- Socialism and Its Ethical Basis

== Electoral history ==
1918 New York 21st congressional district election
Party	Candidate	Votes	%
Democratic	Jerome F. Donovan (incumbent)	33,233	53.54%
Republican	John A. Bolles	25,677	41.37%
Socialist	George Frazier Miller	3,156	5.08%
Total votes		62,066	100.00%

== Works cited ==
=== Books ===
- Bragg, George (1922). History of the Afro-American Group of the Episcopal Church. Church Advocate Press.
- Foner, Philip (1977). American Socialism and Black Americans: From The Age of Jackson to World War II. Greenwood Publishing Group. ISBN 0837195454.
- Johnson, James Weldon (1933). Along This Way: The Autobiography of James Weldon Johnson. Viking Press.
- Kornweibel, Theodore (1975). No Crystal Stair: Black Life and the Messenger, 1917-1928. Greenwood Publishing Group. ISBN 0837182840.
- Moore, John; Preimesberger, Jon; Tarr, David, eds. (2001). Congressional Quarterly's Guide to U.S. Elections. Congressional Quarterly. ISBN 1-56802-602-1.

=== Magazines ===
- "Men of Our Times" (PDF). The Crusader. 1918.

=== Newspapers ===
- "Church To Fete Father England". The New York Age. June 5, 1948. p. 4 – via Newspapers.com.
- "Miller - Rev. Ellen Bulkley Miller". Brooklyn Eagle. October 16, 1923. p. 22 – via Newspapers.com.
- "Miller, Rev. George Frazier". Daily Worker. May 10, 1943. p. A8 – via Newspapers.com.
- "Mortgage Burning Celebrated By St. Augustine's P.E. Church". Brooklyn Eagle. June 27, 1945. p. 10 – via Newspapers.com.
- "New Altar to Honor Memory of Rector". Brooklyn Eagle. July 17, 1948. p. 4 – via Newspapers.com.
- "Services for Negro Pastor". Daily Worker. May 13, 1943. p. 3 – via Newspapers.com.
- "Spends $10 In His Race For Congress". The New York Age. November 23, 1918. p. 1 – via Newspapers.com.
- "Wilson Receives Clemency Petition". The New York Age. February 23, 1918. p. 1 – via Newspapers.com.

=== Web ===
- Morand, Michael (July 26, 2020). "1917 NAACP Silent Protest Parade, Fifth Avenue, New York City". Daily Worker. Archived from the original on March 27, 2025.
