= Salem Crescent Athletic Club =

American sports club for black athletes

The Salem Crescent Athletic Club was a sports club for black athletes in Harlem in Upper Manhattan, New York City, United States. It was established in 1911 by Reverend Frederick Asbury Cullen of the Salem Methodist Episcopal Church. In the early years, the club had a strong track and field team affiliated with the Amateur Athletic Union, with national winners in the 220-yard dash and 440-yard dash events in 1915 and 1925. It later became known for its amateur boxing team, which produced boxers such as Sugar Ray Robinson, who won the Golden Gloves featherweight and lightweight championships in 1939 and 1940. The club also had a basketball team and was a member of the Metropolitan Basketball Association.

== History ==
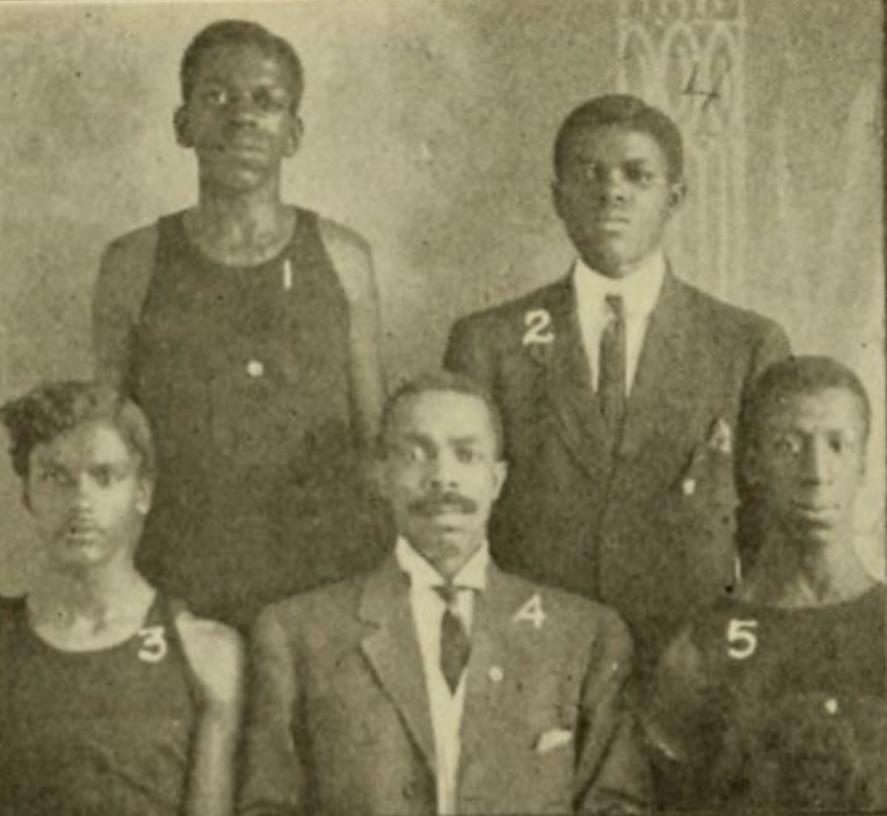
Salem-Crescent A.C. track team in 1911 with Reverend F. A. Cullen (front center)

In 1911, Reverend Cullen started the Salem-Crescent Athletic Club by inviting neighborhood boys to use the Salem Methodist Church for their meetings and getting them involved in the church through sports and other community programs. At the time, the church was located at 129 West 133rd Street. It was one of many athletic clubs for black people which formed because the color line prevented them from joining white YMCA teams and other gyms.

=== Track and field ===
In the early years, Salem-Crescent had success with its track and field team. Led by track captain Lionel LaBeet, the club won a point trophy at the Amateur Athletic Union games in 1912. The club sent athletes to compete in international competitions including the 1915 Panama–Pacific International Exposition in San Francisco.

Title holders from Salem-Crescent A.C. in the Amateur Champions of America included Roy F. Morse in the 220-yards run (1915). In the Junior Amateur Champions of America, Morse won the 100 yards run in 1915, while P. J. White won the 220 yards run in 1917. In 1925, Cecil Cooke was the national winner in the Amateur Athletic Union 440-yard dash.

=== Basketball ===
Salem Crescent Athletic Club competed against local teams such as the Alpha Physical Culture Club in the emerging sport of basketball. It was a member of the Metropolitan Basketball Association, which coordinated amateur clubs in Manhattan, Brooklyn, and Jersey City.

=== Boxing ===
The boxing gym was located in the church's basement at 129th Street and 7th Avenue. Trainer George Gainford joined the Salem-Crescent as boxing coach in 1928. The club had many successful boxers including Sugar Ray Robinson and Buddy Moore, who each won Golden Gloves championships at Madison Square Garden in 1939, and Canada Lee. Salem-Crescent was also where Harry Wiley started his career as a boxing trainer.
