= Charity Folks =

American slave (1757-1834)

Charity Folks (also called Fowkes after 1791) (c. 1757, Belair Plantation, Bowie, Maryland -1834) was an African-American woman who lived in Annapolis, Maryland, both as a slave and a free woman.

== Slavery ==
Charity was born into slavery and held by Maryland Governor Samuel Ogle. Until the age of 10 or 12, Charity lived at Belair Plantation with her mother, Rachel Burke, and brother James; her father is believed to have been plantation manager Colonel Benjamin Tasker, Jr. She was transferred to the ownership of Annapolis's John Ridout. In some reports she accompanied Ogle's daughter Mary to White Hall Plantation in 1764 upon Mary's marriage to John Ridout, Ogle's secretary; Historian Jessica Millward places the transfer sometime between 1765 and 1767, saying that 'It is equally possible that Charity became the property of John Ridout when he served as executor of the estates of Benjamin Tasker, Sr. and Benjamin Tasker, Jr.'

== Family ==
While still enslaved, she married her husband Thomas who was enslaved by another Annapolis merchant until 1794

She and her husband had several children including Harriet Calder (1789-??), who married and had three children with white man William Calder; Mary Folks (1799-??); and namesake Charity Folks Bishop (1793-1877), who married William Henry Bishop, Jr. (1802-1870) "Only Lil' Charity resided with her mother at the Ridout's home in Annapolis". Her older children, Harriet Jackson (1780-??) and James Jackson (1786-??), may have predated the marriage.

Her great-grandson was Rev. Dr. Hutchens C. Bishop, an Episcopalean minister who served as President of the historic 1917 Negro Silent Protest Parade in New York City.

== Freedom ==
She was freed in 1797 by Mary (Ogle) Ridout after John Ridout's death. However, it has been noted that 'the 1797 deed for manumission...was not a gift of immediate freedom.' As a freed woman, she continued working for the same family, and was named in Mary's will. The manumission was recorded by Anne Arundel County Court, Manumission Records in 1807, and in 1811 Charity was issued a certificate of freedom from the same court.

In 1832 she purchased property on Franklin Street in Annapolis, Maryland. She had a stroke in 1834 and died later the same year.

Property she owned was divided into parcels, which were owned by descendants, and much later studied in the late twentieth-century as 'the Courthouse Site' in Annapolis archaeology. The lot at 84 Franklin Street became the Mt. Moriah A.M.E. Church in 1875, and later the Banneker-Douglass Museum (now known as the Banneker-Douglass-Tubman Museum) in 1984.
