= Charles D. Martin (minister) =

American minister of the Moravian Church (1873–1942)

Charles Douglas Martin
- Born: 7 November 1873; St. Kitts, British West Indies
- Died: 1 March 1942 (aged 68); Harlem, Manhattan, New York City, New York
- Occupation: Minister in the Moravian Church

The Reverend Dr. Charles Douglas (C.D.) Martin (November 7, 1873 — March 1942) was a West Indian Moravian minister. He was born in St. Kitts, British West Indies to parents Joseph and Adriana Martin. He founded the Fourth Moravian Church in Harlem, New York in 1903. It was located at 124 West 136th Street, Manhattan. He called the church "Beth-Tphillah" which is Hebrew for House of Prayer. In 1912, he was ordained as the first and only Black minister of the Moravian Church in the United States. He presided over the church from July 1908 until his death in March 1942.

== Negro Silent Protest Parade ==
Martin was active in, and an activist for, the black community that his church served. In 1917, for the NAACP's historic Negro Silent Protest Parade, he worked with the Reverend Hutchens C. Bishop as Secretary and President, respectively. The gathering of thousands of Negroes, marching in silent protest, on a hot July day, made national news and set the model for other protests to follow.

Martin penned the call to action encouraging "people of African descent" to join for the parade. During the parade, Black Boy Scouts passed out flyers to onlookers, white and black alike. In the wake of recent atrocities such as occurred in Waco, Memphis, East St. Louis and with the U.S. occupation in Haiti in mind, he wrote in part, describing "Why We March":

"We march because we are thoroughly opposed to Jim-crow Cars, etc., Segregation, Discrimination, Disfranchisement, LYNCHING, and the host of evils that are forced on us. It is time that the Spirit of Christ should be manifested in the making and execution of laws.

...

We march because the growing consciousness and solidarity of race coupled with sorrow and discrimination have made us one: a union that may never be dissolved in spite of shallow-brained agitators, scheming pundits and political tricksters who secure a fleeting popularity and uncertain financial support by promoting the disunion of a people who ought to consider themselves as one."

== See also ==
- Civil rights movement
