= Philip A. Payton Jr. =

African-American real estate entrepreneur

Philip Anthony Payton Jr.
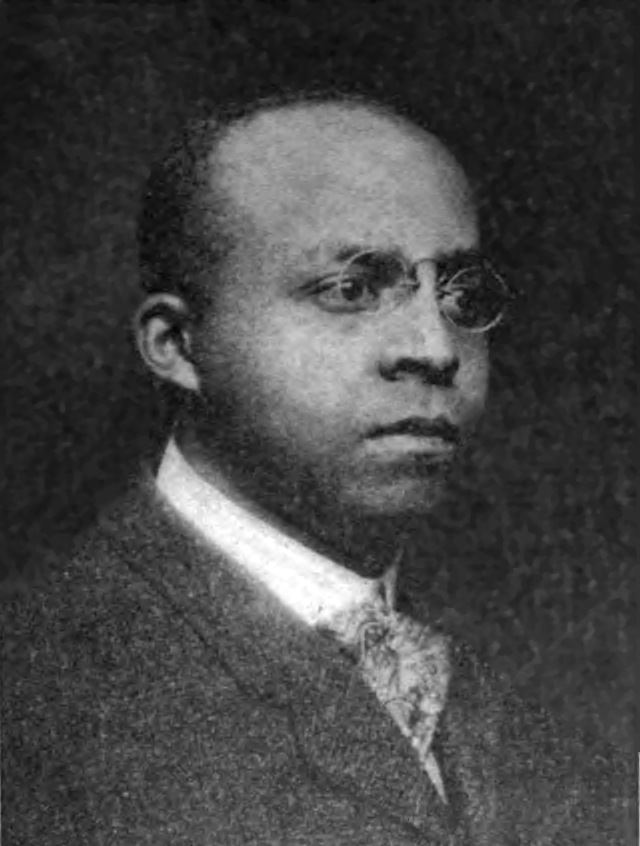
- Philip A. Payton Jr., circa 1914
- Born: February 27, 1876; Westfield, Massachusetts, U.S.
- Died: August 29, 1917 (aged 41); Allenhurst, New Jersey, U.S.
- Education: Livingstone College
- Occupation: Real estate developer
- Spouse: Maggie P. Lee

Philip Anthony Payton Jr. (February 27, 1876 – August 1917) was an African-American real estate entrepreneur. He is known as the "Father of Harlem", due to his work renting properties in Harlem, New York City, to African Americans.

== Early life ==
Philip Anthony Payton Jr. was born on February 27, 1876, in Westfield, Massachusetts. He was born to parents Annie Maria Hammond Ryans and Philip Payton Sr., and was the second of four children in the family, one girl and three boys. His father was a barber and his mother a hairdresser. His father insisted that the children learn a trade, and so trained him in the family profession twice a week after school. Payton claimed to be a full-fledged barber by the age of fifteen.

Joseph Charles Price, founder of Livingstone College in Salisbury, North Carolina, was a personal friend of Payton's father, and Payton attended the institution, and graduated from the institute in 1899. The effects of an injury persisted for most of the following year. His siblings each had a more complete education. His sister graduated from the state normal school (later Westfield State College), and both of his brothers attended Yale University.

Payton worked in the family barber shop until April 1899, when he decided to make more of himself, and left for New York City, against the wishes of both parents. There, he worked as a department store picture and weighing machine attendant at $6 per week, a barber at $5–6 per week, and finally as a porter in a real estate office at $8 per week. While working as a porter, he got the idea of going into the real estate business on his own.

== Real estate ==
Payton first got into the real-estate business as a janitor, but after seeing how the business operated, he decided he wanted to create his own firm. Payton and a partner opened the Brown and Payton real estate firm in October 1900. In June 1901, Payton married. The business was unsuccessful, and Brown left in the spring of 1901. Payton continued the business alone, while his wife sewed to support them.

At the low point, in April and May 1901, the Paytons' cat and dog died, partially due to hunger, and the Paytons were evicted from an apartment house he had been managing, for being unable to pay their rent. Soon after this, though, business improved. Payton got charge of more houses, and began to deal in real estate for himself as well as for others, until he was making profits of thousands of dollars per month.

I knew that if I made one good sale I could make enough to keep me going for a year. I came so near making a good sale so many times that I knew I was bound to hit it before long.

— Philip A. Payton Jr., quoted in The Negro in Business

Sources differ on what was Payton's first break. Several cite an interview in 1911 or 1912 with the New York Age in which Payton recalls:

I was a real estate agent, making a specialty in management of colored tenement property for nearly a year before I actually succeeded in getting a colored tenement to manage. My first opportunity came as a result of a dispute between two landlords in West 134th Street. To 'get even' one of them turned his house over to me to fill with colored tenants. I was successful in renting and managing this house, after a time I was able to induce other landlords to ... give me their houses to manage.

The New York Times states that by 1900, Payton was already managing several buildings housing African-Americans. Yet other sources write that Payton's first success came when he approached the manager of an apartment house on West 133rd Street, which tenants were fleeing because a murder had been committed there, and persuaded him to have the chance to fill it with Black families.

== Afro-American Realty Company ==
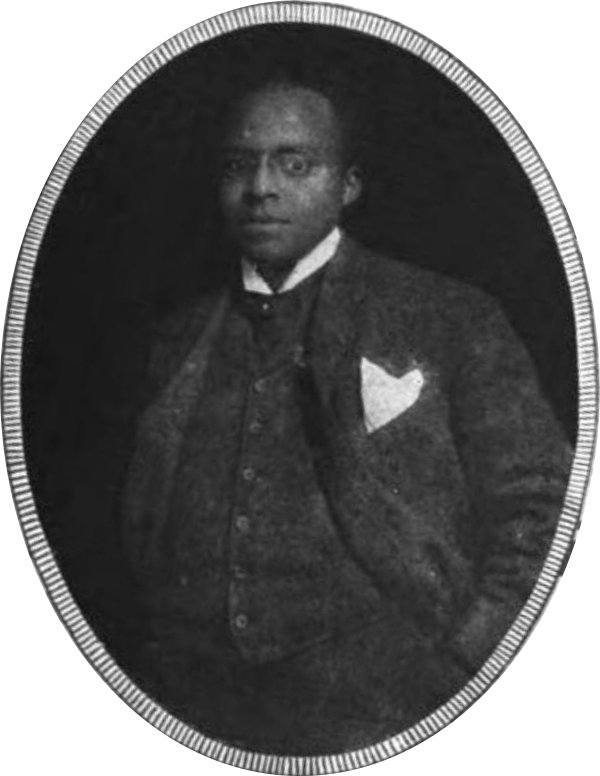
Philip A. Payton Jr., circa 1907

On June 15, 1904, with the help of other affluent Blacks, Payton chartered the Afro-American Realty Company, issuing 50,000 shares at $10 each. Payton's business partner was a mortician named James C. Thomas. Along with Thomas, Payton formed the Afro-American Real Estate Company. He appealed to Black investors specifically, both to their social justice and profit motives, with an ad stating: "Today is the time to buy, if you want to be numbered among those of the race who are doing something toward trying to solve the so-called 'Race Problem.'" His prospectus claimed: "The very prejudice that has heretofore worked against us can be turned and used to our profit."

In 1905, the Hudson Realty Company, a white-owned real estate company, had bought a tract of land on West 135th Street near Lenox Avenue, in the heart of Harlem, for residential development. To make the development property more attractive to prospective builders, it also bought three neighboring tenement buildings from Afro-American Realty, evicted their Black tenants, and replaced them with white tenants. Hudson's builders agreed to only rent their properties to whites. In response, the Afro-American Realty Company bought two adjacent apartment houses, evicted their white tenants, and moved in the Black families evicted by Hudson. Eventually, Hudson sold the original three buildings back to the Afro-American at a large loss. The incident augmented Payton's reputation and drew investors to his company. The New York Times called the moves by Hudson and Afro-American Realty a "Real Estate Race War".

The Afro-American Realty Company bought and leased property in Harlem neighborhoods never until then "invaded" by Black tenants, occasioning near panic among neighboring owners. The New York Herald wrote:

An untoward circumstance has been injected into the private dwelling market in the vicinity of 133rd and 134th Streets. During the last three years the flats in 134th between Lenox and Seventh Avenues, that were occupied entirely by white folks, have been captured for occupation by a Negro population. Its presence there has tended also to lend much color to conditions in 133rd and 135th Streets between Lenox and Seventh Avenues.

One Hundred and Thirty-third Street still shows some signs of resistance to the blending of colors in that street, but between Lenox and Seventh Avenues has practically succumbed to the ingress of colored tenants. Nearly all the old dwellings in 134th Street to midway in the block west from Seventh Avenue are occupied by colored tenants and real estate brokers predict that it is only a matter of time when the entire block, to Eighth Avenue, will be a stronghold of the Negro population.

— "Negroes Move into Harlem", New York Herald, December 24, 1905

White residents were outraged; one sign advertising for colored tenants for a formerly white building was burned to local acclaim.

The Afro-American Realty Company grew to $1 million in assets with annual rent receipts of $114,000. It was not as successful as some stockholders had anticipated, though, and in October 1906, 35 of them brought a lawsuit, charging that the prospectus was fraudulent and overstated the company holdings when it was issued. Payton was arrested on civil fraud charges in January 1907, and the courts ruled in favor of the plaintiffs for investments, damages, and legal costs, later that year. The company issued its first and only dividend in June 1907, but never recovered from the negative publicity effects of the lawsuit and the depression of 1907, stopping operations in 1908.

== After the Afro-American ==
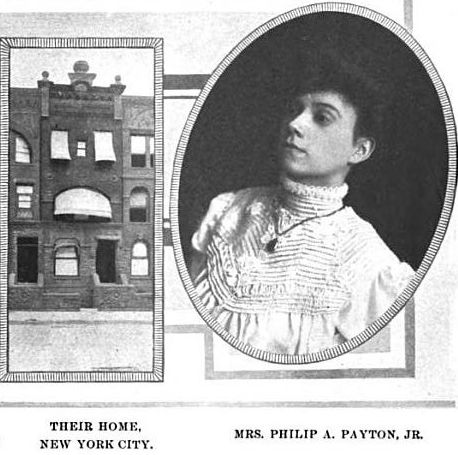
Maggie Payton and 13 West 131st Street, their home in Harlem

Payton continued to buy and manage Harlem real estate for Black tenants, founding the Philip A. Payton Jr. Company, known for its PAP logo. He even ventured outside the city to Long Island. John E. Nail and Henry G. Parker, former directors of the Afro-American Realty Company, founded their own company, Nail & Parker Real Estate, in 1907; it eventually became one of the most successful in New York.

By 1914, The Outlook wrote that three-quarters of the Black population of New York City, including all Blacks of prominence, lived in Harlem; it called Payton "the father of his Negro community". The success of Payton's enterprise could be seen in the neighborhood of 13 West 131st Street, the house he had bought for himself and his wife Maggie in 1903. The entire street was white in 1900; by the time of the 1915 New York State census, the block was almost completely inhabited by Black tenants.

Payton closed his largest deal in July 1917, a sale of six apartment houses for about $1.5 million, the largest sale of housing for Black people to that time. The buildings were renamed after prominent Black figures in the Americas: Crispus Attucks, Toussaint L'Ouverture, Phyllis Wheatley, Paul Laurence Dunbar, Frederick Douglass, and Booker T. Washington. The Black population in Harlem had reached 50,000 or even 70,000.

Payton died of liver cancer a month later at his country house in Allenhurst, New Jersey; he was 41. His younger brother Edward S. Payton, who had served as vice-president of Afro-American Realty, had passed even earlier, in 1912, at the age of 30. The Philip A. Payton Jr. Company survived after him, managing numerous African-American apartments at least until 1922.

The Philip A. Payton Jr Company was co-managed by John E. Nail and Henry C. Parker, who went on to be known as the "little fathers" of Negro Harlem. They worked to fulfill Payton’s dream of making this Harlem neighborhood a political and cultural capital for African-Americans in the area.
