= Salem United Methodist Church (New York City) =

Historic building in Manhattan, New York

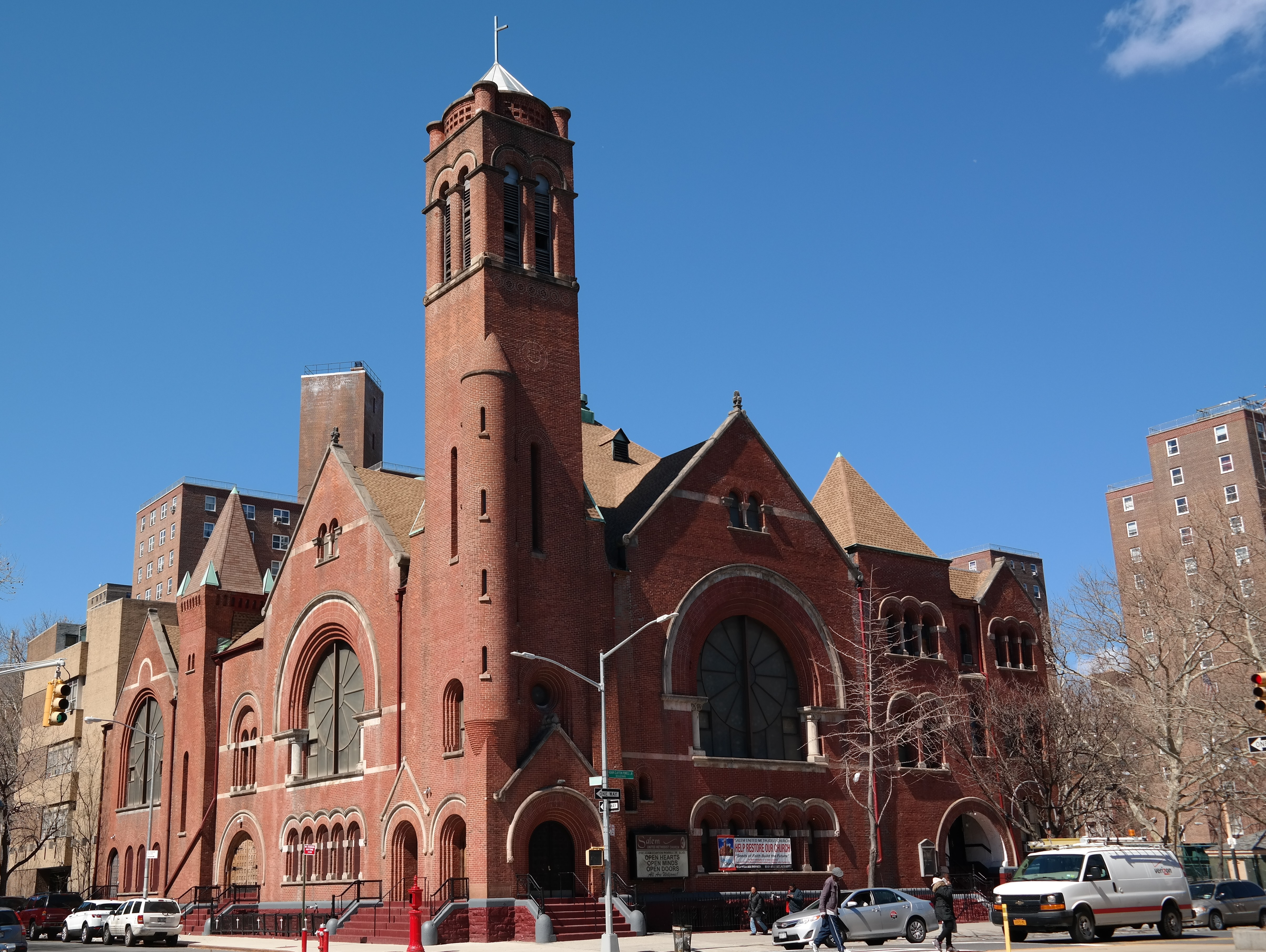
- Salem United Methodist Church
- 40°48′42.8″N 73°56′48.5″W
- Address: 2190 Adam Clayton Powell Jr. Blvd. New York, New York 10027
- Denomination: United Methodist Church
- Previous denomination: Methodist Episcopal Church
- Website: www.salem-harlem.org

History
- Former name: Calvary Methodist Episcopal Church

Architecture
- Heritage designation: U.S. National Register of Historic Places
- Architect: John Rochester Thomas
- Calvary Methodist Episcopal Church
- U.S. National Register of Historic Places
- New York State Register of Historic Places
- Location within Manhattan Location within New York City Location within New York Location within the United States
- Location: 211 W. 129th St., 2190 Adam Clayton Powell, Jr. Blvd., Manhattan, New York, US
- Area: 0.39 acres (0.16 ha)
- Architectural style: Richardsonian Romanesque
- NRHP reference No.: 16000255
- NYSRHP No.: 06101.019083

Significant dates
- Added to NRHP: May 16, 2016
- Designated NYSRHP: March 24, 2016

The Salem United Methodist Church, formerly known as the Salem Methodist Episcopal Church, is a church in the Harlem neighborhood in Upper Manhattan, New York City, United States. Founded in 1881, it moved in 1924 to its current location on the corner of Adam Clayton Powell Jr. Boulevard and 129th Street. As of 2026, it has the largest Methodist membership in New York City and has 2,200 seats. The building is listed on the National Register of Historic Places as Calvary Methodist Episcopal Church.

== History ==
=== Original mission ===
It was founded in 1881 as Salem Chapel, a mission of Saint Mark's Methodist Episcopal Church. On April 18, 1902, Reverend Frederick Asbury Cullen was assigned to Salem Chapel as assistant pastor to Reverend Charles Allbright. Cullen gave his first sermon at the mission two days later. At the time, it occupied a storefront at 250 St. Nicholas Avenue, near 122nd Street.

Reverend Cullen actively reached out to neighborhood children, even playing marbles with them on the sidewalk, to encourage their families to get involved with the church. The Salem congregation grew, and in August 1902 the mission moved to 232 West 124th Street. The mission was granted independent status in 1908.

=== West 133rd Street ===
In 1911, the Salem Methodist Episcopal Church relocated to 102–104 West 133rd Street near Lenox Avenue, with Reverend Frederick A. Cullen as pastor. The property had been purchased by The New York City Missionary and Church Extension Society of the Methodist Episcopal Church on behalf of Salem; the congregation raised $15,000 as partial repayment.

As part of his community outreach, Reverend Cullen established the Salem-Crescent Athletic Club in 1911. The athletic club gave local youths the opportunity to compete in track and field events, competing regionally, nationally, and internationally. It also had a team that played basketball, which was still a relatively new sport. The church sponsored more than 20 organizations in total.

From 1919 to 1920, Aubrey Bowser edited a literary magazine, The Rainbow, which was designated the "official organ" of the Salem Methodist Church. By the early 1920s, the congregation had grown to more than 600 members.

=== Seventh Avenue ===
The church paid $258,500 in 1923 for its current building on Seventh Avenue (now called Adam Clayton Powell, Jr. Boulevard), from Calvary Methodist Episcopal Church. The Salem church was a place of worship for prominent Harlem residents, including singer Marian Anderson and Harlem Renaissance poet Countee Cullen, who got married there to Yolande Du Bois. Their lavish wedding on Easter Monday 1928 had 16 bridesmaids and 16 ushers, and 3,000 guests in attendance, which was 1,800 more than had been invited and 500 more than could be seated in the church at the time. The crowd packed into the aisles and the back of the galleries, obstructing and delaying entry by the bridal procession for 21 minutes.

During his tenure as pastor of Salem Methodist, Reverend Cullen established numerous programs to enrich "the whole person". He hosted lectures and workshops at the church, inviting civil rights activists and intellectuals such as A. Philip Randolph, Walter White, and Arturo Alfonso Schomburg, as guest speakers. Cullen also published a monthly magazine, The Announcer, which was unique for its time in publishing advertisements from local organizations in addition to church and community news.

Boxer Sugar Ray Robinson trained at Salem-Crescent A.C. in the church's basement gym and won two Golden Gloves as an amateur in 1939 and 1940. He also worshiped at the church. In 1950, The Saturday Evening Post reported that every year on Easter Sunday, the ushers at Salem Methodist Episcopal Church reserved a pew for Robinson, so that he could make an impressive entrance.

In 1950, planning began for extensive renovations to the interior of the church, led by Cullen's successor, Reverend Charles Young Trigg. The sanctuary was re-consecrated on April 12, 1953.

== Architecture ==
Built in 1887, the Salem United Methodist Church is a Richardsonian Romanesque-style building designed by John Rochester Thomas. It was originally built for the white congregation of Calvary Methodist Episcopal Church, which later moved to the Bronx. President William McKinley attended Sunday services there on April 30, 1899.

The interior of the church, including the sanctuary, was renovated in the early 1950s for $350,000. The remodeling included new pews, flooring, and restroom facilities. In addition, the parsonage was converted into a family home for the pastor. A pipe organ made by the Möller Organ Company (Opus 5796) was obtained from the Waldorf Astoria Hotel, rebuilt at Salem Methodist Church, and dedicated on April 19, 1953.

The building itself is listed on the National Register of Historic Places as of May 16, 2016.

== See also ==
- National Register of Historic Places listings in Manhattan above 110th Street
