= Richard Edward Dereef =

American lumber trader (c. 1798–1876)

- Born: c. 1798; Charleston, South Carolina, United States
- Died: 1876
- Occupations: Lumber trader, politician
- Organization: Brown Fellowship Society

Richard Edward Dereef (c. 1798–1876) was an African-American enslaver, lumber trader, and politician. A member of a wealthy family of mixed African and European descent, Dereef was a prominent figure in South Carolinian society but faced discrimination because of his race. He was considered one of the wealthiest African-American men in Charleston, South Carolina and served as a city alderman during the Reconstruction era.

== Biography ==
Dereef was from a wealthy, mixed-race family in Charleston. Although well-educated and wealthy, he was subject to discrimination due to his race. Unlike other freedmen, Dereef did not have to pay the Free Black Man's Tax, as he claimed Native American descent from his grandmother. In 1823 he and his cousin, John Cain, went to court and persuaded a Charleston magistrate that the Dereef and Cain families were legitimately descended from Native Americans, exempting them and their children from the tax.

He and his brother, Joseph Dereef (1802–1876), worked as wood factors. The family business operated from Dereef's Wharf. He also owned rental properties on the East Side of Charleston, and some of his tenants were white people. He was considered one of the richest black men in Charleston.

Dereef built a house in Wraggborough. He enslaved as many as 40 people. They were darker-skinned, whereas Dereef belonged to a lighter-skinned group that refused to associate with them and regarded them with disdain in every aspect of life.

Dereef served as a city alderman, having been appointed by military authorities in 1868 during the Reconstruction era. He generally allied himself with Democrats.

In 1872, he was elected to the standing committee of the Brown Fellowship Society. He left a will and testament upon his death.

== Legacy ==
Dereef Court and Dereef Park in Charleston are named after him. In 2012, Dereef Park was slated to be developed with housing units despite protests. In 2017, a compromise was reached to incorporate a park and the historic praise house along with residential development.
