= Silent Parade =

1917 African American protest in New York City

- Part of the anti-lynching movement
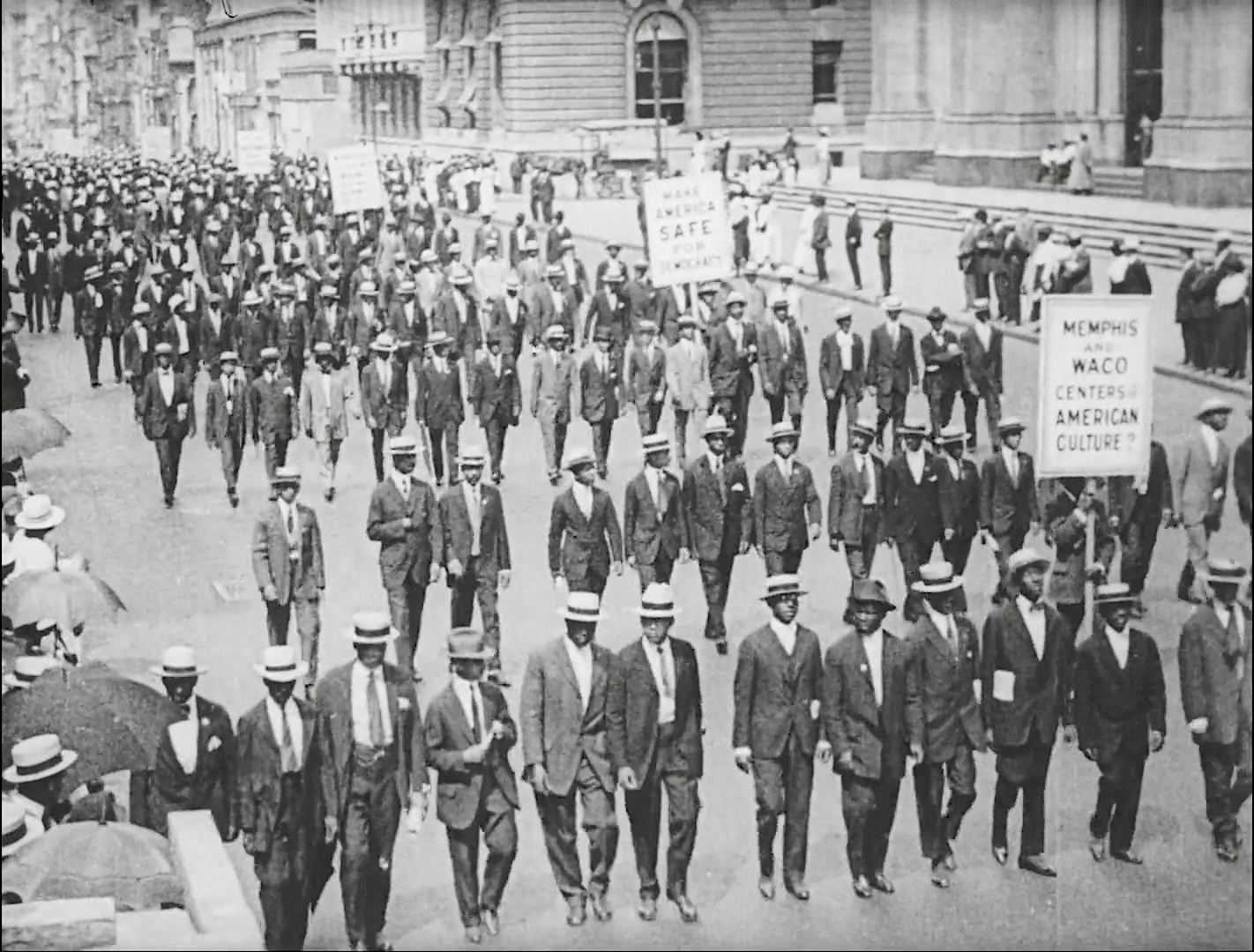
- The 1917 Silent Parade in New York City
- Date: July 28, 1917
- Location: Fifth Avenue, New York City, United States
- Caused by: Murders of African Americans from lynchings and in the East St. Louis massacre
- Goals: To protest anti-black violence; to promote anti-lynching legislation, and advance black civil rights
- Methods: Public demonstration

The Negro Silent Protest Parade, commonly known as the Silent Parade, was a political protest in New York City on July 28, 1917. The primary objective of the march was to draw national attention to the widespread racial violence and entrenched systemic discrimination endured by African Americans. It was organized in direct response to a series of racially motivated attacks in 1916 and 1917, including the East St. Louis massacre and lynchings in Waco and Memphis.

The parade was organized by a coalition of African American groups, led by the recently formed NAACP. Starting at 57th Street, the parade route proceeded down Fifth Avenue, ending at Madison Square. It was a silent procession, with an estimated 8,000 to 15,000 African American participants marching in protest, accompanied by a muffled drum beat.

The event was widely publicized and drew attention to violence against African Americans. Organizers hoped the parade would prompt the federal government to enact anti-lynching legislation. However, President Woodrow Wilson did not act on their demands. Federal legislation was required because Southern states often refused to prosecute lynchings under existing state statutes that outlawed murder, kidnapping, and assault. (Note: In the United States, federal law generally does not include statutes outlawing common crimes like theft, murder, or assault – instead, those crimes are prosecuted by state prosecutors under state laws. Prosecutors in Southern states often refused to prosecute lynchings. African Americans hoped for federal anti-lynching legislation, thus enabling federal prosecutors to prosecute lynchings. Creating a federal law to criminalize lynching was not straightforward, because the 10th Amendment limits federal laws to topics listed in the Constitution, effectively proscribing federal laws for ordinary crimes like murder or assault. Efforts to enact anti-lynching legislation therefore relied on the 14th Amendment, which empowered the federal government to ensure that black citizens were treated equally under the law. The pertinent clause of the 14th Amendment reads: "...nor shall any State deprive any person of life, liberty, or property, without due process of law; nor deny to any person within its jurisdiction the equal protection of the laws." Another constitutional avenue to implement federal civil rights legislation was the Commerce Clause.) The federal government would not pass an anti-lynching law until 2022, when the Emmett Till Antilynching Act was passed.

== Background ==
=== Lynching ===
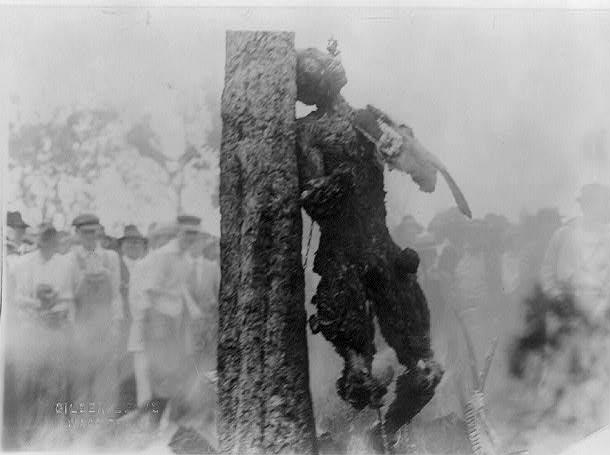
The lynching of Jesse Washington was one of the events prompting the Silent Parade. He was repeatedly lowered into fire for two hours in front of 15,000 white spectators. (Note: This photograph of Washington is an example of many photographs of lynchings printed on postcards, and distributed by white people to celebrate successful lynchings.)

Lynchings are extrajudicial killings carried out—often under the pretense of punishing alleged crimes—by individuals or groups lacking legal or law enforcement authority. These acts frequently involve mob violence and are commonly driven by racial animus. In the United States, documented instances of lynching date back to the 1830s. (Note: There is no consensus on whether lynchings have ceased in the United States. Some commentators conclude that lynching ceased in the mid-to-late 1900s; others characterize some 21st-century killings of African Americans as lynchings.) Lynching was a brutal manifestation of racism directed at African Americans, occurring alongside systemic forms of discrimination such as disenfranchisement and segregation. (Note: For more details of the racism of that era, see Nadir of American race relations.) The frequency of lynchings steadily increased after the Civil War (1861‍–‍1865), peaking around 1892. They remained common into the early 1900s, with a notable spike in 1915 following the founding of the Second Ku Klux Klan.

Southern states often failed to prosecute lynchings under existing state laws prohibiting murder, kidnapping, and assault. Federal authorities lacked the legal means to intervene, as no federal statutes at the time specifically criminalized lynching. In response, anti-lynching activists in the early 1900s advocated for new federal legislation to empower federal prosecutors to take action when state officials refused to do so.

The Silent Parade took place at a time when the anti-lynching movement was gaining momentum, led in large part by the NAACP. Founded in 1909, the NAACP sought to advance equal rights for African Americans. Two years before the Silent Parade, the NAACP's magazine The Crisis published an article titled "The Lynching Industry", which contained a year-by-year tabulation of 2,732 lynchings, spanning the years 1884 to 1914. During the year leading up to the parade, The Crisis – edited by W. E. B. Du Bois – published a series of articles documenting specific lynchings, including: a group lynching of six African Americans in Lee County, Georgia; the lynching of Jesse Washington, a mentally impaired 17-year-old African American, in Waco, Texas; (Note: The article broke new ground by using undercover reporting to expose the conduct of local white people in Waco, Texas. The Crisis included photographs of the lynching.) and the lynching of Ell Persons in Memphis, Tennessee. (Note: The Crisis published a second article about the Ell Persons lynching, in August 1917, after the Silent Parade had occurred.) Anger over these lynchings was one of the motivations for the Silent Parade.

=== World War I ===
In April 1917, one month before the East St. Louis massacre, the United States declared war on the German Empire and joined the Allied Powers of World War I. The mobilization effort dominated the headlines in the United States. African American soldiers of that era were treated as second-class citizens, and were segregated from white troops. African Americans had mixed feelings about the war: some recognized military service as an opportunity to demonstrate their worth; others viewed it as yet another situation where they would be exploited by their country. Some African American leaders, such as Du Bois, voiced pro-war sentiments, and encouraged African Americans to join the military.

=== East St. Louis massacre ===
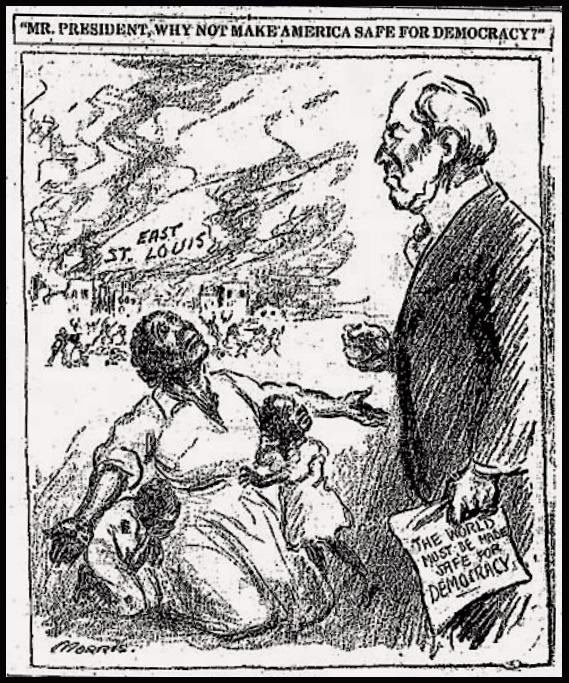
1917 political cartoon showing Wilson ignoring the plight of African Americans amidst the riots in East St. Louis (Note: This cartoon was published in The Kansas City Sun, July 14, 1917. Wilson is holding a newspaper with the headline "The World Must be Made Safe for Democracy", which is a quote from a speech made by Wilson to Congress in April 1917, seeking a declaration of war against Germany. The cartoon is noting the irony that Wilson went to war to protect democracy for Europeans, but failed to protect African Americans in his own country.)

The Silent Parade was triggered by a series of riots in East St. Louis between May and July 1917. The rioting, by white residents, originated when the mostly white employees of the Aluminum Ore Company voted in spring 1917 for a labor strike and the company recruited hundreds of African Americans to replace them. The ensuing racial tensions led to widespread violence, with an estimated 39 to 200 African Americans killed by white people. In addition, hundreds were injured, and thousands were displaced from their homes. Nine white Americans were killed. (Note: Estimated number of deaths ranged from 39 to 200.)

Du Bois and activist Martha Gruening visited the city after the massacre and spoke with witnesses and survivors. In September 1917, they published a photo-essay in The Crisis that described the riots in graphic terms. After the riots, many African Americans were discouraged, and felt that it was unlikely that the United States would ever permit African Americans to enjoy full citizenship and equal rights. The brutality of the attacks by mobs of white people, coupled with the failure of police to protect the African American community, led to renewed calls for African American civil rights from leaders such as Du Bois, Hubert Harrison, and Marcus Garvey. In response, the NAACP began planning a public protest.

== The parade ==
=== Planning ===
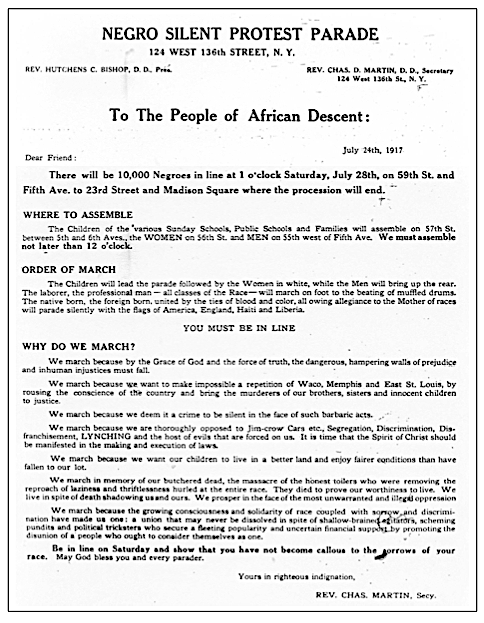
Leaflet announcing the Silent Parade, published July 24, 1917, signed by Charles Martin (Note: Although the leaflet was signed by Martin, it may have been written by Johnson.)

James Weldon Johnson, the field secretary of the NAACP, worked with a group of influential community leaders from St. Philip's Church in New York to determine how best to protest the recent violence against African Americans. (Note: Johnson joined the NAACP in 1916, and 1917 – the year of the Silent Parade – was his first full year in that position.) Initial plans considered a protest at Carnegie Hall but – after the East St. Louis riots – Johnson proposed a silent march. The idea of a silent protest was based on a suggestion made in 1916 by Oswald Garrison Villard during an NAACP Conference. The Silent Parade was not the nation's first silent march: Villard's mother, anti-war activist Fanny Garrison Villard, had organized a silent march in 1914 to protest the war.

Johnson orchestrated the march, and his use of silence – which contrasted sharply with the brutality of lynchings and race riots – served to emphasize the message. Silence as a rhetorical tool was also employed by the Silent Sentinels suffrage protest group, which staged silent protests in front of the White House starting in January 1917.

The parade was organized by a committee composed of representatives from the NAACP, churches, and businesses. Two prominent members of the New York clergy served as executives of the parade: the president was Hutchens Chews Bishop, rector of the city's oldest African American Episcopal parish; and the secretary was Charles Martin, founder of the Fourth Moravian Church. Frederick Asbury Cullen served as vice president. Parade marshals included nationally prominent African Americans J. Rosamond Johnson, Christopher Payne, Everard W. Daniel, James Weldon Johnson, and John E. Nail. Du Bois marched within the group of parade leaders.

While the organizers of the Silent Parade did not explicitly exclude white people from marching (many NAACP leaders were white), no white people participated because the parade was intended to be a demonstration of African American solidarity and unity.

A week before the parade, an announcement in the African American newspaper The New York Age described it as a "mute but solemn protest against the atrocities and discrimination practiced against the race in various parts of the country." The official name of the parade was the Negro Silent Protest Parade, although some contemporary sources referred to it as the Negro Silent Parade. Men, women, and children alike were invited to take part. It was hoped that ten thousand people would participate, and that African Americans in other cities might hold their own parades. During the week before the parade, major newspapers in several states published articles announcing the march.

The goal of the parade was to protest lynching in particular, and violence against African Americans in general. (Note: The African American newspaper The New York Age publicized the parade a week beforehand, writing: "The Silent Parade ... should be made a mute but solemn protest against the atrocities and discriminations practiced against the race in various parts of the country... As a sober, dignified protest against the wrongs complained of, as well as a protest against the failure of the proper authorities to provide adequate protection and redress, the parade should be made as imposing as numbers and bearing can make it. The ministers of the various churches, together with all race organizations and societies, should rally to make this movement a monster success.") A specific objective was to urge President Woodrow Wilson to support the enactment of federal anti-lynching legislation. Organizers prepared a leaflet which was distributed before the parade as an invitation, and during the parade to bystanders. The leaflet contained a section titled "Why We March", which read, in part:

We march because we want to make impossible a repetition of Waco, Memphis, and East St. Louis ... and to bring the murderers of our brothers, sisters and innocent children to justice. We march because we deem it a crime to be silent in the face of such barbaric acts. We march because we are thoroughly opposed to Jim Crow cars, etc., segregation, discrimination, disfranchisement, lynching, and the host of evils that are forced on us.... We march because we want our children to live in a better land and enjoy fairer conditions than have fallen to our lot. We march in memory of our butchered dead... (Note: "Waco" and "Memphis" refer to the recent lynchings in those cities.)

The leaflet was signed by Martin as "Yours in righteous indignation."

=== The march ===
Rare newsreel footage of the parade, discovered in the Yukon in 1978 after being buried in permafrost for 50 years

In the midst of a record heat wave in New York City on Saturday, July 28, an estimated 8,000 to 15,000 African Americans marched in silent protest. The march began at 57th Street, and proceeded down Fifth Avenue, ending at Madison Square. Mounted police escorted the parade.

Many marchers carried signs and banners that described contributions of African Americans to American society, or gave reasons for the protest. (Note: After the parade, an issue of The Crisis magazine included an article that listed approximately 60 slogans that were displayed on placards. Some examples: "America has lynched without trial 2,867 Negroes in 31 years and not a single murderer has suffered".; "We have fought for the liberty of white Americans in 6 wars; our reward is East St. Louis".; "We are maligned as lazy and murdered when we work".; "Our music is the only American music".) Some signs appealed directly to President Wilson. One banner displayed an African American family in the ruins of East St. Louis, pleading with Wilson to bring democracy to the U.S. before he brought it to Europe. Police deemed the banner in "bad taste", so parade organizers withdrew the banner before the parade began. (Note: The banner was an enlargement of a political cartoon from The Kansas City Sun.)

Several hundred children led the parade, followed by several thousand women dressed in white, then men. (Note: Historian Philip Dray states 300 children and "nearly 5,000" women.) The men wore formal attire or military uniforms, and they marched in rows. Some of the men carried drums, which were muffled, and beat a slow cadence.

The placement of children and women at the front of the parade drew attention to the profound impact that lynching and racism had on African American families. Following the march, The Crisis published several photographs of the parade, all but one of which featured women and children. (Note: The NAACP later published a photo of the Silent Parade children in the first issue of its monthly children's magazine The Brownies' Book.) Their refined attire visually highlighted the connection between respectability and civil rights. Visual cues also made a connection between the military service of African Americans and their demands for equal rights. Some of the men wore their U.S. Army uniforms and carried placards drawing attention to the fact that – just a few months before the parade – African Americans were among the first U.S. soldiers to arrive in France after the U.S. joined World War I. A large sign carried at the front of the women's section read: "The first blood for American independence was shed by a Negro – Crispus Attucks."

More than 20,000 spectators of all races looked on from both sides of Fifth Avenue, including an estimated 15,000 African Americans. African American Boy Scouts handed out leaflets describing why they were marching. Some White people stopped to listen to marchers explain the reasons for the march, while other White bystanders expressed support for the parade. Many spectators were moved by the spectacle; in his autobiography, organizer James Johnson wrote: "[T}he streets of New York have witnessed many strange sights, but I judge, never one stranger than this; among the watchers were those with tears in their eyes."

== Legacy ==
=== Aftermath ===
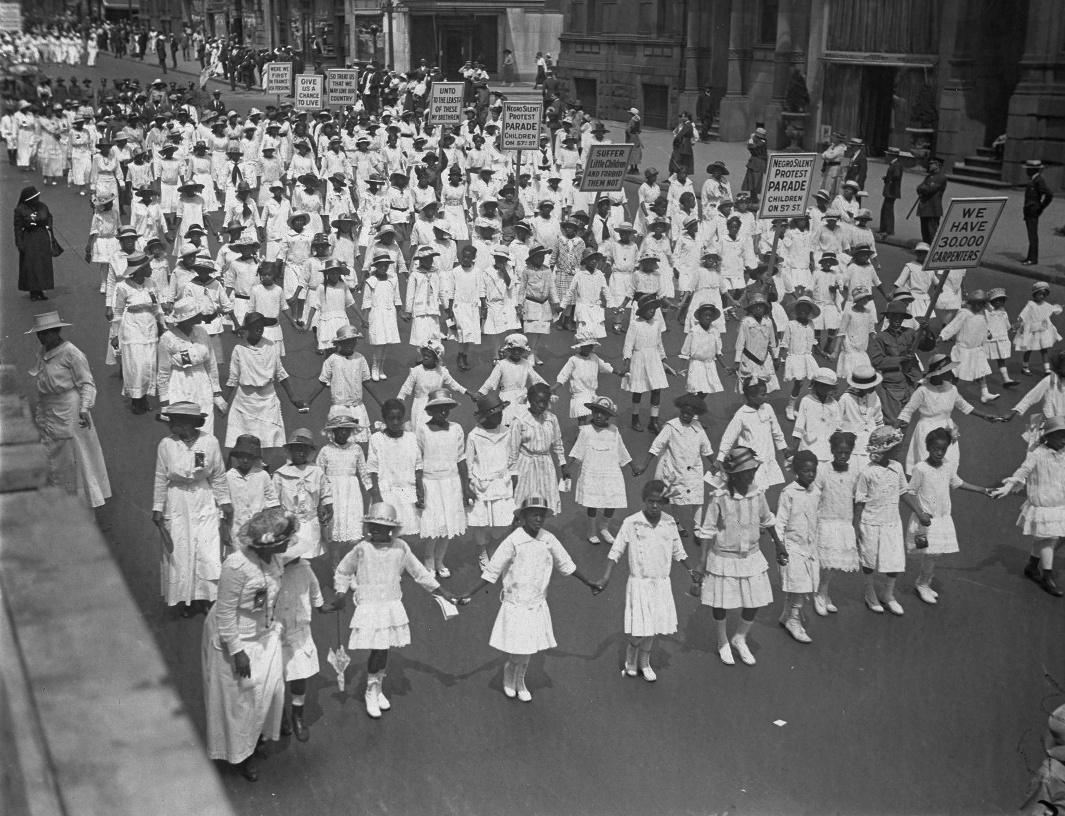
Children led the Silent Parade, followed by women, then men.

The protest was widely reported in newspapers across the country, and successfully raised public awareness of the lynchings and other acts of violence committed against African Americans. The New York Times described the parade in an article published the following day:

To the beat of muffled drums 8,000 negro men, women and children marched down Fifth Avenue yesterday in a parade of "silent protest against acts of discrimination and oppression" inflicted upon them in this country, and in other parts of the world. Without a shout or a cheer they made their cause known through many banners which they carried, calling attention to "Jim Crowism", segregation, disenfranchisement, and the riots of Waco, Memphis, and East St. Louis.

Historian Patricia Sullivan described it as "one of the most stunning protest marches in the annals of the black freedom struggle." The parade was the first large, exclusively African American protest in New York. Media coverage of the march helped to counter the dehumanization of African Americans in the United States: the demeanor and appearance of the marchers was dignified, civilized, and respectable. The New York Age described the parade as "[t]he coming together of all classes of Negroes to further a common cause", noting that several disparate groups of black people marched in unity, including Haitians and West Indians.

The parade and its coverage depicted the NAACP as well-organized and efficient, and helped increase the visibility of the NAACP among both White and Black people. The march sparked a revival of the New York branch of the NAACP: initially established in 1911, the branch had become dormant by 1916, but was reactivated in November 1917. (Note: The NAACP leaders that helped organize the parade belonged to the national NAACP organization, because the New York branch was dormant in 1916‍–‍1917. When the New York branch was established in 1911, it was headquartered in Harlem. When revived in November 1917, it was also located there, and was referred to as the Harlem branch.)

=== President Wilson ===
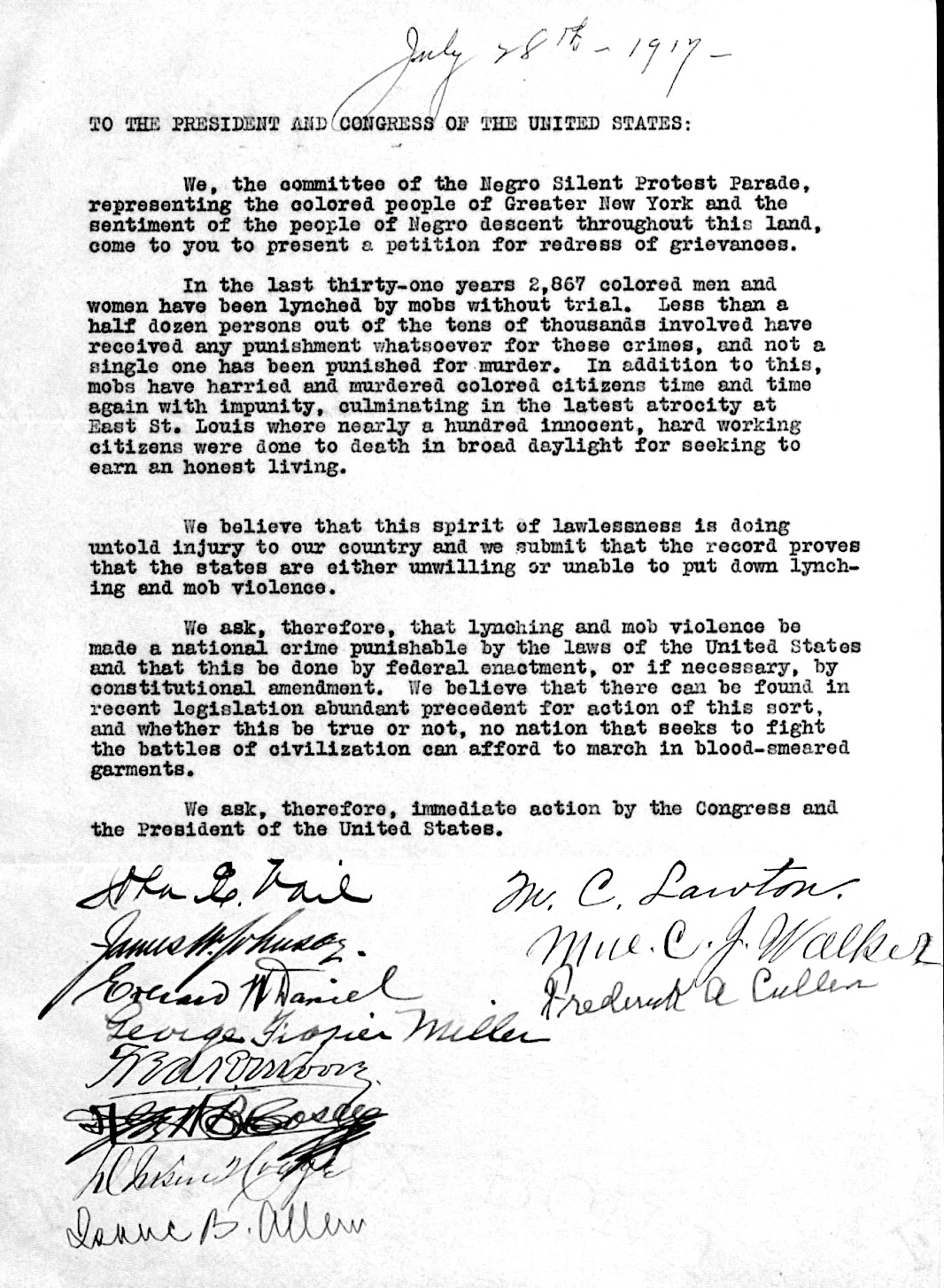
Petition submitted by the NAACP to President Wilson shortly after the Silent Parade

Marchers hoped to persuade President Wilson to implement anti-lynching legislation and support African American civil rights. Four days after the Silent Parade, a group of NAACP leaders traveled to Washington, D.C. for a prearranged appointment with Wilson. Upon arrival at the White House, the group was told that Wilson was unable to meet with them due to another appointment. (Note: The group was turned away by Wilson's personal secretary Joseph Patrick Tumulty.) They left a petition they had prepared for Wilson, which reminded him of African Americans serving in World War I and asked him to take steps to prevent lynchings in the future. (Note: The petition was signed by John E. Nail, James Weldon Johnson, Everard W. Daniel, George Frazier Miller, Fred R. Moore, A. B. Cosey, D. Ivison Hoage, Isaac B. Allen, Maria C. Lawton, Madam C. J. Walker, and Frederick A. Cullen (chairman).) Two weeks later, Wilson met with a smaller delegation from the NAACP and listened to their concerns. Eleven months later, in July 1918, Wilson issued a written statement discouraging mob violence, but it fell short of calling for anti-lynching legislation. Discrimination against African Americans significantly increased during the Wilson presidency (1913–1921) as a result of Wilson's policy of segregating the federal government workforce.

=== Impact on lynching ===
The annual number of African American lynchings increased following the parade and did not decline below the 1917 level until 1923. Lynchings persisted in the United States at least into the 1960s. In 1918, the Dyer Anti-Lynching Bill was introduced in Congress, but it failed to become law, suffering the same fate as nearly 200 anti-lynching bills that were introduced between the end of the Civil War and the civil rights movement. (Note: Many anti-lynching bills passed the House of Representatives, but were defeated in the U.S. Senate by senators from Southern states.) The Civil Rights Act of 1968 created new federal crimes for violent acts based on the race of the victim. In 2022, Congress passed the Emmett Till Antilynching Act, which extended existing federal hate crime laws to encompass any members of a mob who conspired to injure a victim.

=== Subsequent silent marches ===
After the Silent Parade, James Johnson sent letters to all NAACP branches, suggesting that they organize similar marches. Three months after the Silent Parade, a smaller version of the march – with 1,800 African Americans – took place in Providence, Rhode Island, in October 1917. (Note: The identity of the organizers of the Rhode Island march is unknown.) (Note: The Bureau of Investigation (BOI, predecessor of the FBI) felt that African American anger following the East St. Louis massacre might lead them to collaborate with Germany during WWI. The BOI investigated the Rhode Island march for possible German influence, but found nothing. The BOI also investigated The Crisis and other African American endeavors.) After the Dyer Anti-Lynching Bill was introduced in Congress, two silent marches were organized by African Americans to show support, including one on June 14, 1922, in Washington, where about 5,000 people marched in front of the White House and the Capitol holding signs supporting the anti-lynching legislation. In the same month, female members of the NAACP in Newark, New Jersey, organized a similar silent parade.

During WWII, the African American advocacy group March on Washington Movement organized a march in Washington – modeled on the Silent Parade – protesting the execution of Odell Waller and segregation in the armed forces. Seventy-two years after the Silent Parade, another NAACP-sponsored silent march took place in Washington, D.C. on August 26, 1989, to protest recent Supreme Court decisions which restricted affirmative action programs. The U.S. Park Service estimated that more than 35,000 people participated. After two African American transgender women were killed in 2020, a protest was organized in Brooklyn, drawing thousands of attendees; organizers used the Silent Parade as inspiration, and asked protesters to wear white and remain silent for the initial part of the demonstration.

=== 100th anniversary ===
Several events commemorated the hundredth anniversary of the Silent Parade, on July 28, 2017. The Google Doodle for that day depicted the Silent Parade, and linked to the parade's Wikipedia article – many people reported that the Doodle was the first time they learned about the march. In East St. Louis, a series of events were held to commemorate the 1917 riots. Around 300 people marched from the Southern Illinois University Edwardsville Higher Learning Center to the Eads Bridge. The marchers reenacted the 1917 parade, walking in silence, with many women in white and men wearing black suits.

A group of artists, along with the NAACP, reenacted the silent march in New York on the evening of July 28, 2017. The event, with around 100 people and many participants wearing white, was not able to march down Fifth Avenue because the city would not grant access due to Trump Tower's location on that street. The commemoration took place on Sixth Avenue instead, and the group held up portraits of contemporary victims of violence by both police and vigilantes in the United States.
