= Leroy Bundy =

Leroy Bundy (April 14, 1873 – May 28, 1943) served as a city councilman in Cleveland from 1929 to 1937. Before serving as city councilman, however, Bundy, an African American, was accused of leading a mob that sparked the East St. Louis riots of July 2, 1917. Bundy was the last person to be tried out of 34 defendants, 20 of these defendants were white, and all of the defendants received imprisonment. Bundy served one year in prison and worked as a dentist while imprisoned. Following his release, Bundy became a city councilman and led the fight to block seating of delegates that excluded African Americans at the Republican National Convention in Cleveland.

== Early years ==
Bundy was born from into a prominent family in Cleveland. There are few published details on his early life. He was married to a woman named Vella. He and Vella adopted a boy from Africa. Later in his life, he graduated from Case Western Reserve dental school in 1903 and received a degree in dentistry. He then moved to St. Louis in 1909, where he became an entrepreneur who owned a service station, garage, and small car agency.

== East. St. Louis Riots ==
Bundy was accused of participating and leading the East St. Louis riots. Tensions in East St. Louis heightened due to competition for jobs with African American labor force in St. Louis seen as a threat by some white people. The riot was initiated by the injury of two and death of another two policemen. Rioters caused a total of $400,000 in property damage, drove 6,000 African American laborers from the area and killed by some estimates upwards of 200 people, the overwhelming majority of whom were African-American.

During his trial, Bundy received help and funding from the N.A.A.C.P. On March 28, 1919, Bundy was found guilty of being the mob leader of the East St. Louis riots. The key evidence that lead to Bundy's incarceration was testimony from Edward Wilson. Wilson testified against ten other defendants, all of whom were also convicted. In jail, it is alleged that Wilson was beaten by police to testify against Bundy. Even though in the court, Wilson admitted that Bundy did not participate in the mob Bundy was still found guilty by the all- white jury of conspiracy to commit murder in the death of Sergeant Samuel Coppedge and sentenced to life in prison. After spending a year in prison, where he also worked as a dentist, he was released following an appeal to the Illinois Supreme Court.

== Cleveland City Council ==
After his release he returned to Cleveland and pursued a law degree from Western Reserve. He was anointed as "Sir. Leroy Bundy" and served as the city councilman from 1929 to 1937 and lead the fight to block seating of delegations that excluded African Americans at the Republican National Convention in Cleveland. Due to his experiences in St. Louis he encouraged black citizens to be able to defend themselves.
