= Hutchens Chew Bishop =

American priest (1859–1937)

- Born: 1859; Baltimore, Maryland, United States
- Died: 17 May 1937 (aged 77–78); Savannah, Georgia
- Occupation: Priest in The Episcopal Church

The Reverend Dr. Hutchens Chew (H.C.) Bishop (1859 – May 17, 1937) was an Episcopal priest who spent most of his career in New York City. He was rector of St. Philip's Episcopal Church in Harlem for 47 years. The church is the oldest black Episcopal parish in New York. The church was founded by abolitionists who laid the first stone in 1819.

He was born in Maryland, the son of William Henry Bishop III (1824-1906) and Elizabeth Chew Bishop (d. 1886), into an old and respected Episcopal family. His grandfather, William Bishop (1802-1870) was one of the twelve wealthiest men in Annapolis. His great-grandmother was Charity Folks, a notable Annapolis woman who lived there both as someone's property, a slave, and a property owning free woman. In Protest and Progress: New York's First Black Episcopal Church Fights Racism, author John H. Hewitt writes,

For many years his ancestors were prominent in St. James Church in Baltimore. His father and older brothers and sisters were among the upper-class blacks who established the second congregation of black Episcopalians in the city, the Chapel of St. Mary the Virgin, in 1867. [This] became the church of Baltimore's aristocrats of color.

He was the first black student admitted to the General Theological Seminary in New York. He graduated in 1881 and was ordained on April 24, 1882. He became rector of St. Mark's Church in Charleston in 1883. Hutchens was different than the majority of his minister peers. Historian William M. Welty comments that Bishop was a city boy, raised in an urban environment. Also, he and his parents were all free, and as the first black student in theology school, he was educated with whites.

He married Estelle Gilliam of New York, a member of one of the most socially prominent black families, and of the St. Philip's congregation, in 1885.

On January 1, 1886, he became rector of St. Philip's Church in New York City. He would continue in this role for the next 47 years, until 1933.

His son, Shelton Hale Bishop (1889-1962), served as rector of the same church, with a dignified career in his own right.

In 1910, Bishop worked with prominent Harlem businessman John Nail to purchase real estate for St. Philip's. White sellers were less likely to sell to a black man, so Bishop passed for white so as to complete the sale. All in all he purchased the land to build the current location of St. Philip's Church, along with 10 apartment properties. The state's first Black registered architect, Vertner Woodson Tandy, was commissioned by Bishop to design the new church building.

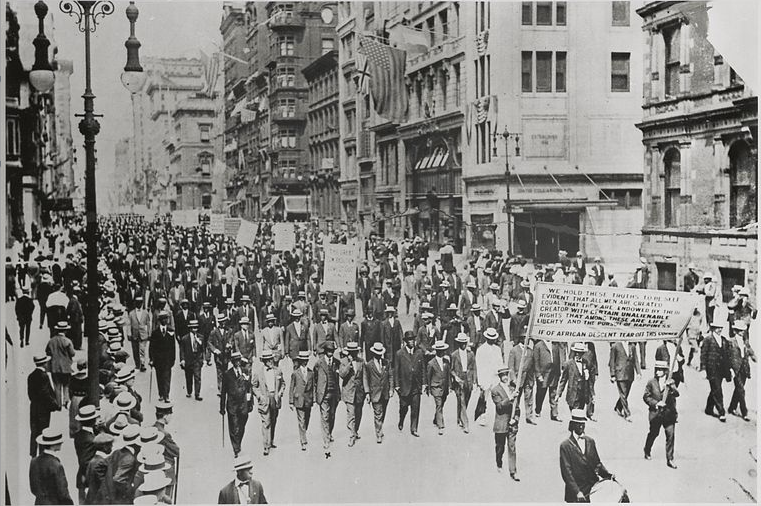
The Men's section of the Silent Parade, being led by Bishop, W.E.B. Du Bois, James Weldon Johnson, and John Nail.

In 1917, Bishop served as president of the historic Silent Parade, along with fellow New York clergy Rev. Dr. Charles D. Martin, who served as secretary. Bishop's church, St. Philip's, served as the coordination center for planning activities. He marched along with W.E.B. Du Bois, James Weldon Johnson, and businessman John Nail.
