= John E. Nail =

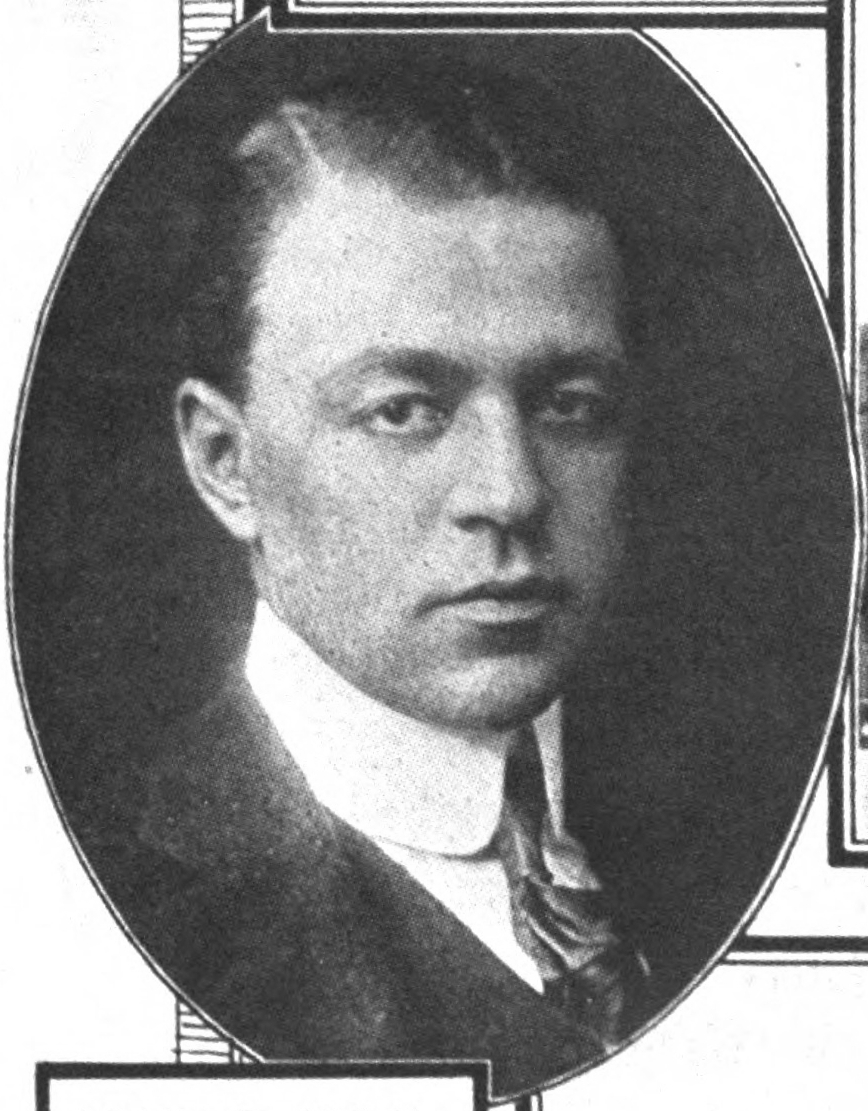
Nail c. 1923

John E. Nail (August 22, 1883 – March 6, 1947) was an African-American real estate agent in New York City, significant for developing Harlem. His sister was Grace Nail Johnson, wife of James Weldon Johnson, both civil rights activists.

Nail got his start in the real estate business working for Philip A. Payton, Jr.'s Afro-American Realty Company, another real estate firm catering to African American customers in New York City. In 1905, he founded the Nail-Parker Company with Henry G. Parker. In 1911, Nail, together with his pastor, Rev. Hutchens C. Bishop of St. Philip's Episcopal Church, bought over a million dollars' worth of real estate in the Harlem area of New York City. Starting in the late 19th century, African Americans began moving from the Southern United States into the New York City area.

Nail realized that most of the new arrivals were not financially able to purchase homes and began converting or constructing apartments on his land purchases. By 1925, Nail's business owned around fifty apartment buildings in the Harlem area. Nail became the most important Black real estate agent in New York City, and sat on the Real Estate Board of New York and the Housing Committee of New York; in each case he was the only African-American member.

After the Great Depression struck, Nail's business entered bankruptcy in 1933. Nail attempted to restart successor businesses but was unable to get them off the ground. Nail died in 1947. His work left Harlem a community of renters, rather than owners, and led ultimately to the area being populated by working-class tenements.

== Negro Silent Protest Parade ==
John Nail served on the planning committee for the NAACP's historic 1917 Negro Silent Protest Parade. He walked with W.E.B. Du Bois, his pastor Hutchens C. Bishop, and others in the Parade.
