= Brown Fellowship Society =

African-American self-help society (1790–1945)

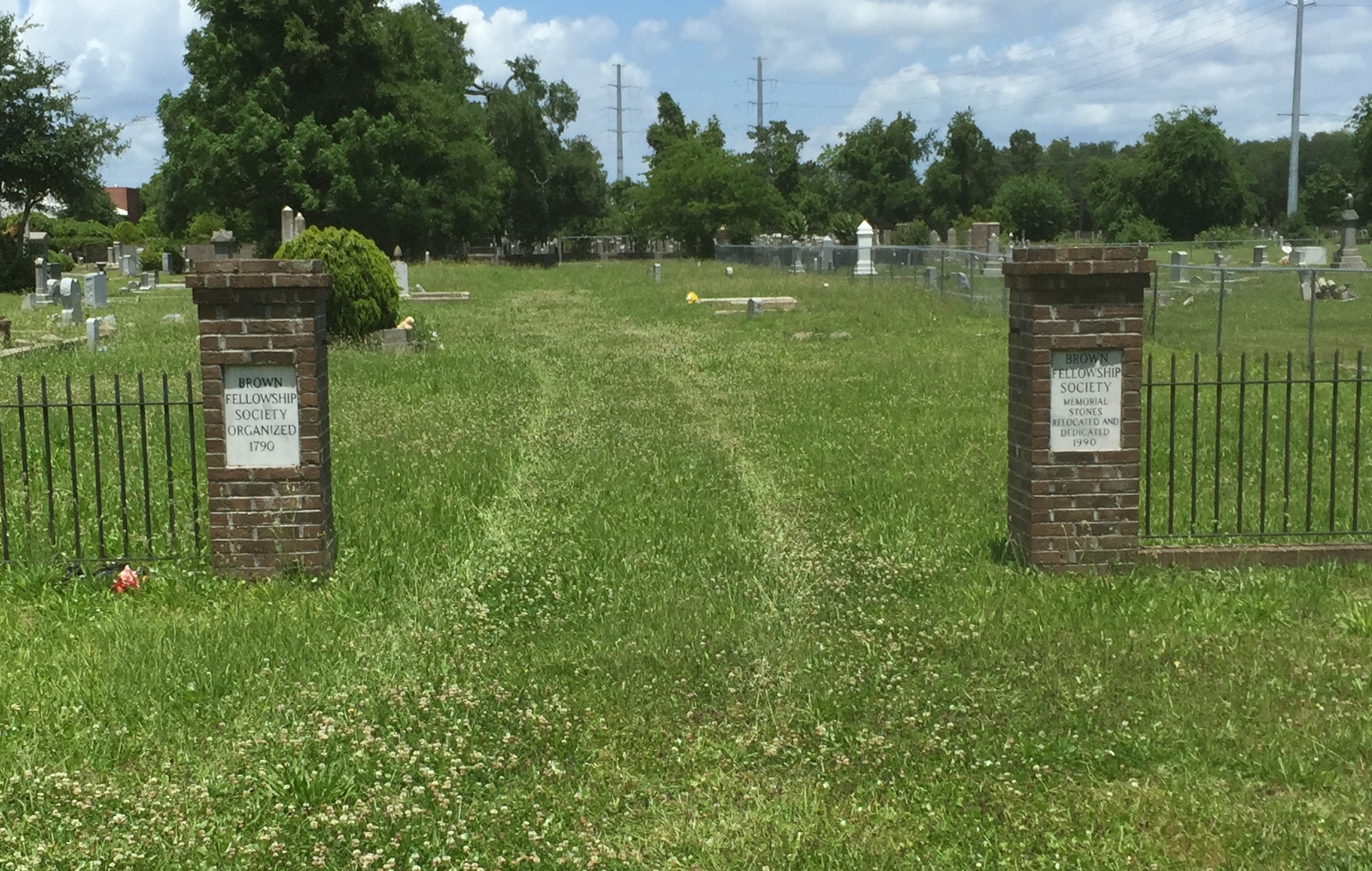
Brown Fellowship Society Graveyard, Charleston, South Carolina (2015).

The Brown Fellowship Society (founded 1790), which later became the Century Fellowship Society, was a benevolent organization for African American and mixed race people affiliated with the St. Philip's Episcopal Church in Charleston, South Carolina.

The Society's records are currently held at the Avery Research Center for African American History and Culture and the University of South Carolina.

== History ==
The Brown Fellowship Society was founded in Charleston, South Carolina in 1790 with the motto “Charity and Benevolence”. It was founded by five mixed-race freedmen affiliated with St. Philip’s Episcopal Church: James Mitchell, George Bampfield, William Cattel, George Bedon, and Samuel Saltus. The Society was founded “to provide benefits which the white church denied them like a proper burial ground, widow and orphan care, and assistance in times of sickness”. Those who joined the club considered themselves “brown”, mulattoes, an important distinction at the time when society in Charleston recognized three races: White, Mulatto, and Negro, including octoroons and quadroons. During the Society's infancy, members were African American or mixed race men.

The Society was limited to 50 members, each who had to pay a $50 membership fee, and went through three different votes before being admitted. The main activities of the Society included care for widows of members, providing a primary school, and supporting members' businesses. The organization's treasury provided a source of capital for members to create businesses, procure real estate, and make investments. Some members of the Society had their own businesses, often artisanal in nature. Membership was often equated with higher social status, and the organization maintained significant relationships with white Charleston elites. Membership was allegedly rejected on the basis of skin color, with claims that "no person whose skin was darker than the door of the meetinghouse would be considered for membership." The organization's records, including membership certificates, make no claims of denial caused by colorism.

In Charleston, laws and regulations were put in place after the Denmark Vesey Conspiracy in 1822, forbidding more than seven Black people to congregate without the presence of a white man. Members of the Brown Fellowship Society provided records to inspectors which allowed them exemption from the rule. To avoid suspicion from white Charlestonians, talks about political or religious matters were forbidden.

After the Civil War, in 1893, the Society was renamed the Century Fellowship Society and expanded to include more African Americans and freed people, including women and people with darker skin. A women's auxiliary, "the Daughters of the Century Fellowship Society" was created in 1907. The organization continued to provide burial and social benefits into the 1990s.

When the city of Charleston passed an ordinance in 1943 prohibiting private organizations from maintaining graveyards, the Century Fellowship Society sold the original Society cemetery in the 1940s to the Catholic Diocese of Charleston. After the purchase, the Diocese promised to move the gravestones, monuments, and remains to a different cemetery off Cunnington Avenue. In 2001, four grave sites were discovered after construction of the College of Charleston's Addlestone Library had started. During construction, the cemetery site was paved over and now sits underneath the Addlestone Library parking lot on Pitt St. A dedication ceremony was held in 2008 for a memorial honoring three African American cemeteries: the Brown Fellowship Society, the Humane Brotherhood, and the MacPhelah Society.

== Related Societies ==
Due to inequitable access of resources on the basis of race, other mutual aid organizations were created to provide access to cemeteries and offset burial costs for freed people in the Antebellum. These burial society cemeteries in Charleston include the Brotherly Association, the Friendly Moralist Society, the Friendly Union Society, the Christian Benevolent Society, the Unity & Friendship Society, the Humane & Friendly Society, the Lewis Christian Union, and the Reserved Fellowship Society.

Other benevolent organizations were later formed, including the Humane Brotherhood, founded in 1843 to support "free, dark men." There have been unverified claims that Thomas Small originally organized the Brotherhood due to color discrimination by the Brown Fellowship Society. The Minor's Moralist Society was an offshoot organization that was subsidized by the Brown Fellowship Society.
