= Metropolitan Basketball Association (New York) =

The Metropolitan Basketball Association (MBA) was an early 20th-century amateur basketball league in the New York City area. It was established in the late 1910s to coordinate basketball games among African American athletic clubs in Manhattan, Brooklyn, and Jersey City. The original three members of the MBA credited with starting organized basketball in New York included the Spartan Athletic Club, the Smart Set Athletic Club, and the St. Christopher Athletic Club. The association strongly opposed professionalization in amateur basketball, and demanded that member teams release players who played sports for pay.
