= Lynching of Ell Persons =

African American who was lynched in the U.S.

Coordinates: 35.160°N 89.881°W

Ell Persons was a black man who was lynched on 22 May 1917, after he was accused of having raped and decapitated a 15-year-old white girl, Antoinette Rappel, in Memphis, Tennessee, United States. He was arrested and was awaiting trial when he was captured by a lynch party, who burned him alive and scattered his remains around town, throwing his head at a group of African Americans. A large crowd attended his lynching, which had the atmosphere of a carnival. No one was charged as a result of the lynching, which was described as one of the most vicious in American history, but it did play a part in the foundation of the Memphis chapter of the NAACP.

== Death of Rappel and arrest of Persons ==
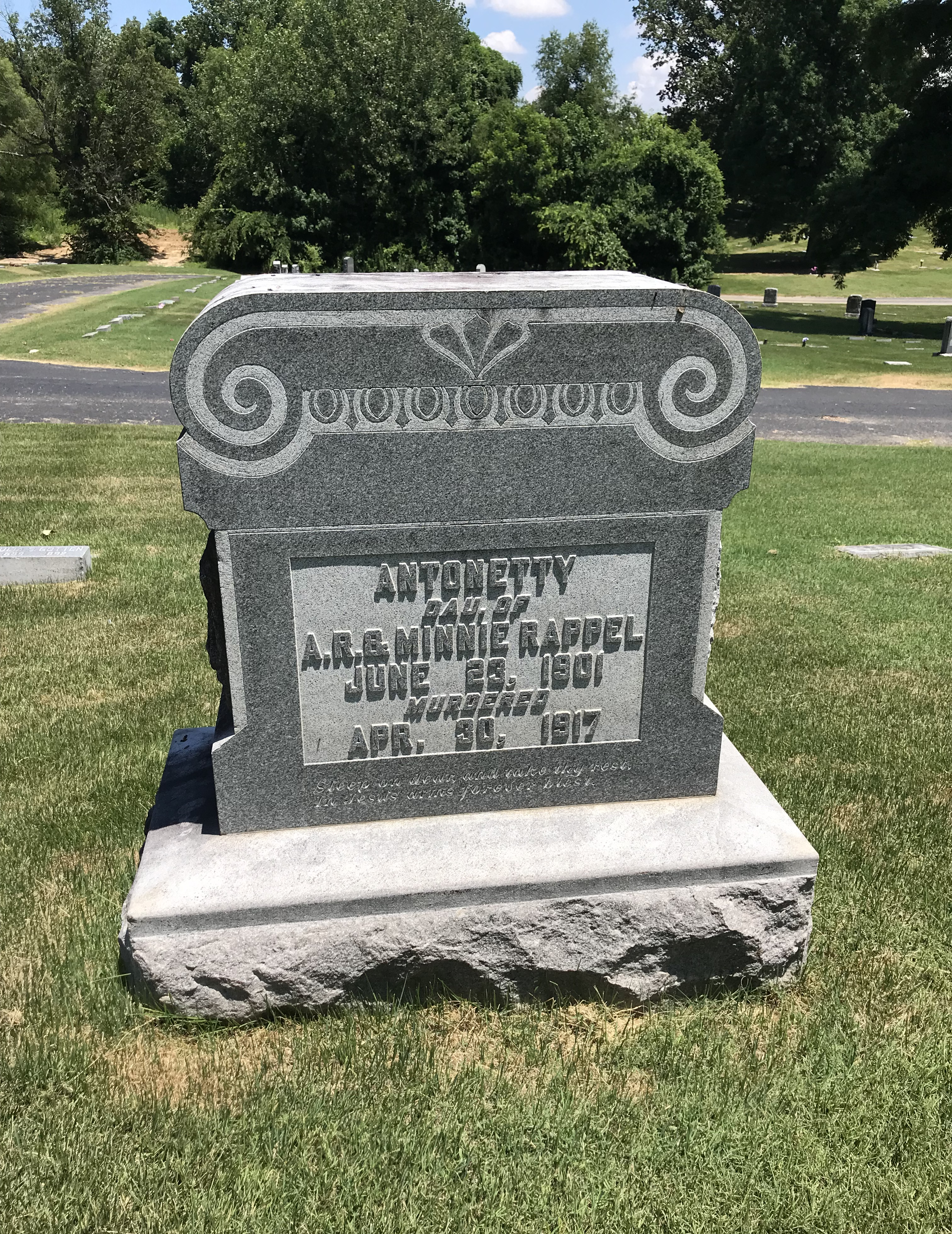
Grave of Antoinette "Antonetty" Rappel - Forest Hill Cemetery Midtown Memphis, TN

Described as "[i]nnocent, pure, pretty, by turns playful and pensive" and as someone who "must have reminded many readers of their own daughters, nieces, or cousins", Rappel was a student at Treadwell School in Memphis. On the morning of 30 April 1917, she left for school and did not return; on 2 May 1917 a newspaper published a story which said she left to join the war, a story her mother, Mrs Wood, reportedly believed. Later, Rappel was found dead, with evidence she had been raped, in woods near Macon Road and half a mile from the home of Persons, (Note: Spelled "Person" by a few sources; see Vandiver and Coconis, p. 897. Some accounts give his middle name as "T."; see, for example, The Crisis, August 1917; Benjamin.) a nearly fifty-year-old woodcutter. She had been decapitated with an axe. At the scene, they found a white coat, a white handkerchief, and axe dents in the ground. After the arrests of several black men, the police brought in Persons, and subjected him to brutal treatment for 24 hours, after which the police said he confessed to the murder. Sheriff Mike Tate, Deputy Sheriff M.W. Palmer, City Detectives C. A. Brunner and J. W. Hoyle alternated with rapid fire questions that led to the confession. Eager to prove Persons' guilt, Mike Tate, Shelby County sheriff, ordered that Rappel's body be exhumed so that they could look at her pupils, because the authorities thought that a photograph of the pupils could be used to show the last image seen by a person who had died, a theory developed by Alphonse Bertillon, a French biometrics researcher of that time. Despite being told by eye specialists that it would be impossible, the authorities said they saw Persons in Rappel's pupils—which showed a "frozen expression of horror"—and he was taken to Tennessee State Prison in Nashville to await arraignment and trial. Deputy Sheriff Palmer along with Detectives Brunner and Hoyle encountered angry mobs at nearly every city along the way before they safely reached Nashville via train and placed Persons in custody.

== Capture ==
A few weeks later, on 19 May, Tate ordered that Persons be returned to stand trial on 25 May, and on 21 May Persons was on a train to Memphis when he was captured by a lynch party, an event which was planned and which was reportedly anticipated by the authorities. The group had earlier stormed the Memphis police headquarters and did not find him there; knowing he had to return, they started searching trains bound for Memphis. The press reported that the mob was organised—one newspaper reporting "That the mob ... is determined to lynch the Negro is evident"—and may even have raised funds for those spying on Persons at Nashville. David J. Mays, who later became an attorney and Pulitzer Prize winner, was one of those involved in the planning; he "howled with excitement" when he heard the news of the capture, news that quickly spread to nearby towns. On 17 May judges from the county criminal court had tried but failed to persuade the state governor, Thomas Clarke Rye, to send men to protect Persons. Even before the capture, the press had been predicting that unofficial action would be taken against him. There is no evidence, according to Margaret Vandiver and Michel Coconis, that the authorities tried to regain Persons or to prevent the lynching.

== Lynching ==
The Commercial Appeal's headline on the day of the lynching, 22 May, read:

Mob captures slayer of the Rappel girl: Ell Persons to be lynched near scene of murder; May resort to burning.

It reported that the lynching was going to take place between 9.00 and 9.30 a.m. near the bridge at Wolf River. The paper's second item was their daily cartoon, "Hambone's Meditations", of an African American who possessed the stereotypical attributes of illiteracy and submissiveness to whites—the behaviour expected of African Americans from white Memphians, according to Kenneth K. Goings and Gerald L. Smith; they write that the announcement of the lynching "indicated the consequences facing those who chose to behave otherwise". One newspaper reported that it was the first time a lynch party had operated in broad daylight and without masks.

The scene at Macon Road near the bridge on the day of the lynching was like a "holiday" according to one newspaper, many people having stayed overnight. In the morning hundreds of men, women, and children gathered, and by 9.00 a.m. the road was packed with automobiles. A total of about 5,000 people attended the event, which had a carnival-like atmosphere according to Goings and Smith. Spectators bought soft drinks, sandwiches, and chewing gum, women wore their best clothes, and parents excused their children from school. One teacher at a school had 50 boys absent. Because of examinations, some county schools closed early, allowing the children to attend. Two trucks of drinks sold out swiftly, and sales of sandwiches and chewing gum were high. Boyce House, a young reporter who covered the police for The Commercial Appeal newspaper in Memphis, accompanied four plainclothes officers to the scene of the lynching.

Having arrived separately to Persons at about 9.00 am, Rappel's mother gave a speech: "I want to thank all my friends who have worked so hard on my behalf ... Let the Negro suffer as my little girl suffered, only 10 times worse"—sentiments which were echoed by the crowd. Persons was chained down, had a large quantity of gasoline poured over him, and set alight. The leader of the group had asked Rappel's mother if she wanted to light it. She declined, but said she "wished Persons to suffer the tortures he dealt to his victim". Persons was reportedly calm and casual, and made no sound except for a "faint pig squeal" when set alight. Mays said he stood close to his head "in spite of the African odor" and watched the whole performance. Members of the mob tried to help women who could not see get a better view, but they failed because of the sheer numbers. While Persons was burning, spectators snatched pieces of his clothes and the rope used to bind him. A newspaper described the moment of the lighting: "A crowd of some 5,000 men, women and children cheered gloatingly as the match was applied and a moment later the flames and smoke rose high in the air and snuffed out the life of the black fiend."

Persons' body was decapitated and dismembered, and his remains were scattered and displayed across Beale Street—the centre of the African American community in Memphis—where his head was thrown from a car at a group of African Americans. According to Charles W. Cansler, a spokesman for the local black community, his head was thrown into a room which contained black doctors. His remains were taken as souvenirs, and photographs of his head were sold on postcards for months after the event. The Commercial Appeal's headline the day after the lynching read: "Thousands cheered when negro burned: Ell Persons pays death penalty for killing girl", and their editorial on 25 May described the lynching as "orderly. There was no drunkenness, no shooting and no yelling."

== Aftermath ==
William Fineshriber, rabbi of the nearby Temple Israel, took action in response to the lynching: he called a congregational meeting to protest, convinced the membership to endorse a public condemnation, and acted as secretary to a group of clergymen who issued a statement, copies of which appeared in local newspapers on 25 May. Cansler wrote a letter in February 1918 to Rye in which he condemned the lynching, in addition to others, writing that white females were eager to attend the lynching—"much after the manner of the ultra fashionable ladies of the early 18th century who crowded the places of execution to see the many poor wretches hanged"—and that "Tennessee got credit (?) for putting this Negro out of the way in up-to-date fashion".

The investigating jury was created to "act fearlessly, fairly, and impartially", but no one was charged for the crime. James Weldon Johnson, field secretary of the NAACP, investigated the case shortly after the lynching, and said there was no evidence Persons was guilty. Standing on the spot where Persons died, he reflected:

I tried to balance the sufferings of the miserable victim against the moral degradation of Memphis, and the truth flashed over me that in large measure the race question involves the saving of black America's body and white America's soul.

Cansler also said an independent investigation suggested the same result. Benjamin Brawley wrote in A Social History of the American Negro (1921) that "the whole matter of the fixing of the blame for the crime and the fact that the man was denied a legal trial left grave doubt as to the extent of his crime".

The lynching played a part in the founding of the Memphis chapter of the NAACP, one of the first in the South, by Robert Church Jr., Bert M. Roddy, and other black businessmen. At a meeting on 11 June 1917, there were 53 members, most of whom were businessmen and professionals; over the next few months, membership grew into the hundreds. Roddy was elected the president of the branch, and Church was elected to the national board of directors. By 1919 the branch was the largest in the South. Darius Young writes that the lynching and the establishment of the chapter led to significant changes to the political and social structure in the South. The lynching also led to increased involvement by African Americans in the Lincoln League, a black political organisation founded by Church in 1916, which was influential in Republican politics in Memphis in the late 1910s and 1920s. The Chicago Defender once alleged that the taunting of a black person about the lynching led to the East St. Louis Riot of May–July 1917.

At the time, racially motivated violence against African Americans in Memphis was common, but lynchings were not. The lynching was the last of a series of "publicly sponsored violence" against African Americans in Memphis that began with the 1866 Memphis riots, according to Beverly G. Bond and Janann Sherman, and lynchings in Memphis ceased after this. According to Kenneth K. Goings and Gerald L. Smith, the case shared similarities with other lynchings in the area against African Americans around that time: it was an open attempt to keep the African American community in its place, the authorities were involved in acting against African Americans, and the case was unsuccessful in subduing the African American community. Kenneth T. Jackson, professor of history at Columbia University, called the lynching—the largest in Shelby county history in terms of number of people involved—one of the most vicious in American history. About 50 years after the event, Mays reflected, "Certainly we have come a long way since that time."

== Memorials ==
Two markers have been placed to commemorate the event, and the lynching site has been listed on the National Register of Historic Places.

=== Marker 1 ===
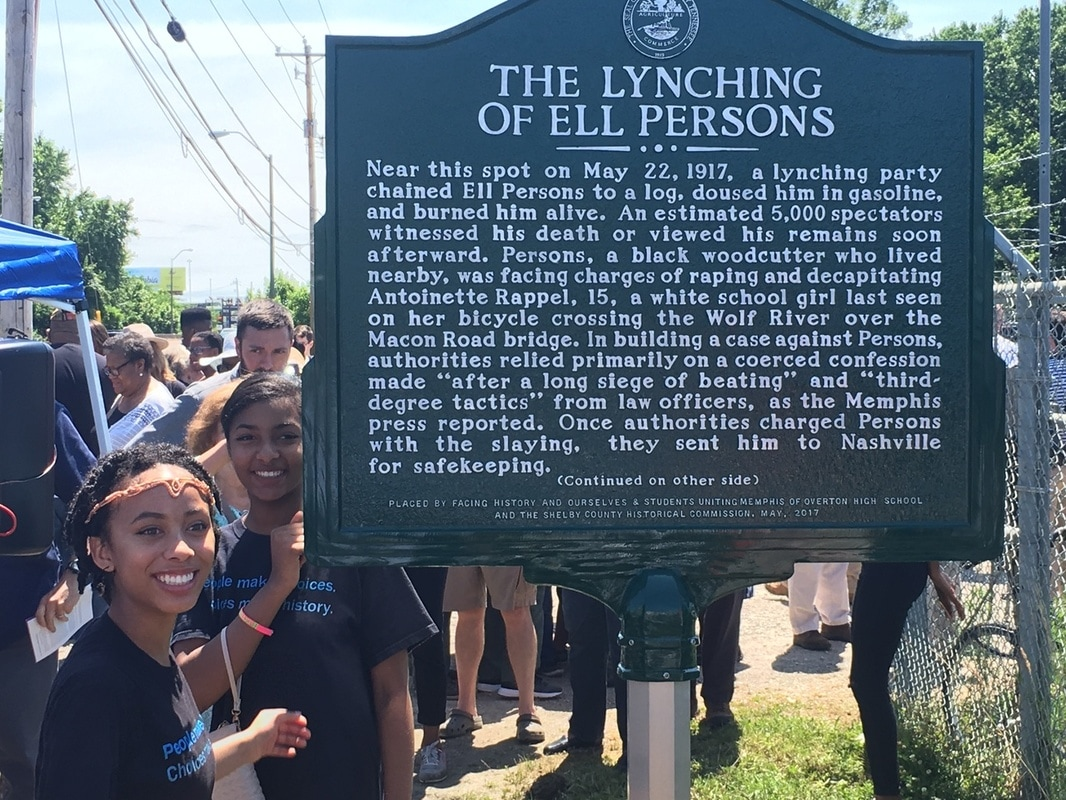
A historical marker was dedicated near the site on the 100-year anniversary of the lynching.

On May 22, 2017, the one-hundred-year anniversary of the lynching, an historical marker was unveiled at the site.

The process for the marker's placement began when a class of students from the Facing History and Ourselves class at Overton High School (Memphis, Tennessee) learned about the story. They formed a non-profit called Students Uniting Memphis and raised the funds to have the marker placed on Summer Avenue, near the Wolf river. According to the marker, it was also sponsored by the Shelby County Historical Commission.

The new marker was unveiled at a prayer service organized by the Lynching Sites Project of Memphis, which was attended by relatives of Ell Persons and Antoinette Rappell.

The text on the marker is:

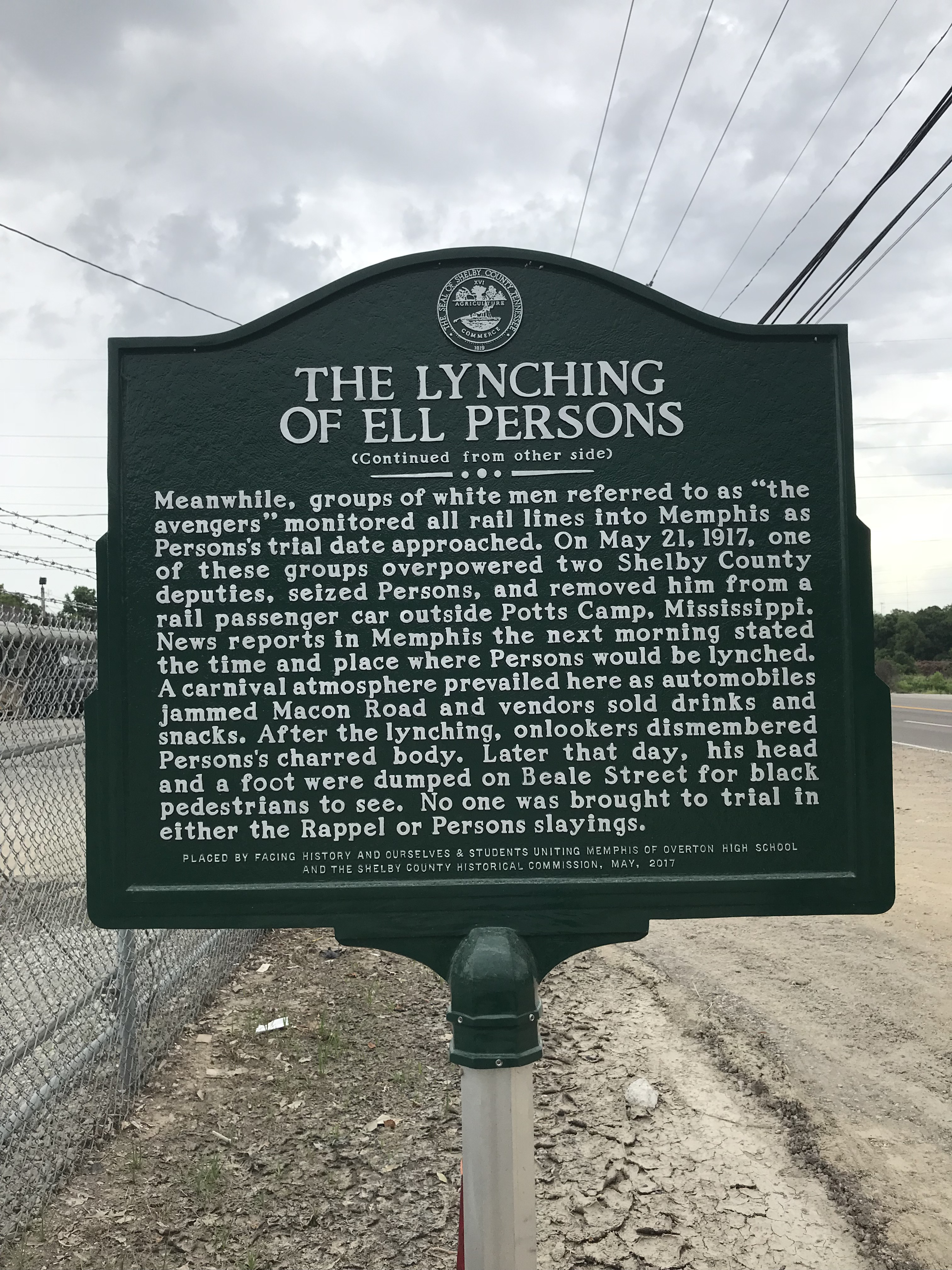
Back side of Historical Marker near the site

Near this spot on May 22, 1917, a lynching party chained Ell Persons to a log, doused him in gasoline, and burned him alive. An estimated 5,000 spectators witnessed his death or viewed his remains soon afterward. Persons, a black woodcutter who lived nearby, was facing charges of raping and decapitating Antoinette Rappel, 15, a white school girl last seen on her bicycle crossing the Wolf river over the Macon Road bridge. In building a case against Persons, authorities relied primarily on a coerced confession "made after a long siege of beating" and "third-degree tactics" from law officers, as the Memphis press reported. Once authorities charged Persons with the killing, they sent him to Nashville for safekeeping.

Meanwhile, groups of white men referred to as "the avengers" monitored all rail lines into Memphis as Person's trial date approached. On May 21, 1917, one of these groups overpowered two Shelby County deputies, seized Persons, and removed him from a rail passenger car outside Potts Camp, Mississippi. News reports in Memphis the next morning stated the time and place where Persons would be lynched. A carnival atmosphere prevailed here as automobiles jammed Macon Road and vendors sold drinks and snacks. After the lynching, onlookers dismembered Person's charred body. Later that day, his head and foot were dumped on Beale Street for black pedestrians to see. No one was brought to trial in either the Rappel or Persons slayings.

=== Marker 2 ===
A second marker, located at the intersection of Summer Avenue and Bartlett Road, was erected at the same time by the Memphis Branch NAACP, the National Park Service, and The Lynching Sites Project of Memphis. The text of this marker is:

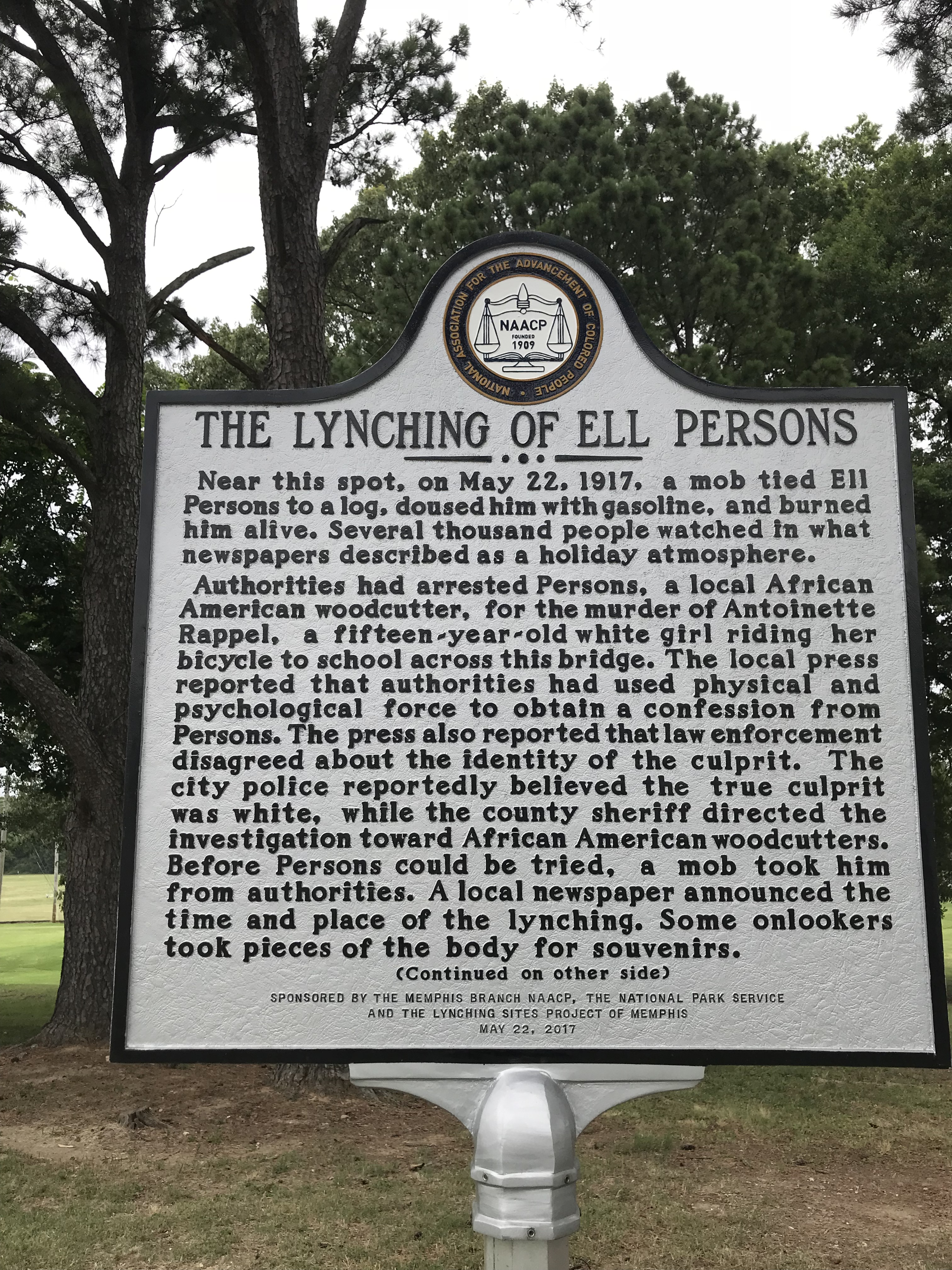
NAACP Historical Marker near the site of the Ell Persons lynching

Near this spot, on May 22, 1917, a mob tied Ell Persons to a log, doused him with gasoline, and burned him alive. Several thousand people watched in what newspapers described as a holiday atmosphere.

Authorities had arrested Persons, a local African American woodcutter, for the murder of Antoinette Rappel, a fifteen-year-old white girl riding her bicycle to school across this bridge. The local press reported that authorities had used physical and psychological force to obtain a confession from Persons. The press also reported that law enforcement disagreed about the identity of the culprit. The city police reportedly believed the true culprit was white, while the county sheriff directed the investigation toward African American woodcutters. Before Parsons could be tried, a mob took him from authorities. A local newspaper announced the time and place of the lynching. Some onlookers took pieces of the body for souvenirs.

Others dismembered what was left of Persons and drove to Beale Street where they threw his head and a foot at African American pedestrians.

No one was ever tried for either violent crime.

NAACP Field Secretary James Weldon Johnson came to Memphis to investigate the lynching of Ell Persons. He concluded that there was "no positive evidence" pointing to Persons' guilt. As a result of Johnsons' report, Robert R. Church, Jr. and other community leaders formed the local branch of the NAACP in June 1917. By 1919, the Memphis branch was one of the largest in the South.

"The way to right wrongs is to

shine the light of truth upon them."

-Ida B. Wells

== Sources ==
- "Memphis" (PDF). Supplement to The Crisis. July 1917.
- "The Lynching at Memphis", The Crisis 14 (4): 185–188, August 1917.
- Brawley, Benjamin (1921) [2007]. A Social History of the American Negro, BiblioBazaar (originally published by Macmillan), p. 346. ISBN 978-1-4346-2296-9. See the book at Project Gutenberg.
- Lamon, Lester C. "Charles W. Cansler to the Honorable Tom C. Rye Governor of Tennessee, February, 1918", The Journal of Negro History 57 (4): 407–414, October 1972. Hosted by JSTOR. (subscription required)
- Lamon, Lester C. (1977). Black Tennesseans, 1900–1930, University of Tennessee Press. ISBN 1-57233-162-3.
- McKee, Margaret; Chisenhall, Fred. (1981). Beale Black & Blue: Life and Music on Black America's Main Street, Louisiana State University Press, p. 18. ISBN 0-8071-1886-9.
- Honey, Michael K. (1993). Southern Labor and Black Civil Rights: Organizing Memphis Workers, University of Illinois Press, pp. 17–18. ISBN 0-252-06305-8.
- Goings, Kenneth K.; Smith, Gerald L. ""Unhidden" Transcripts: Memphis and African American Agency, 1862–1920", Journal of Urban History 21: 372–394, March 1995. Hosted by SAGE Publications. (subscription required) doi:10.1177/009614429502100304.
- Kalin, Berkley. "A Plea for Tolerance: Fineshriber in Memphis" in Bauman, Mark K.; Kalin, Berkley. (eds.) (1997). The Quiet Voices: Southern Rabbis and Black Civil Rights, 1880s to 1990s, University of Alabama Press, pp. 56–58. ISBN 978-0-8173-0892-6.
- Vandiver, Margaret; Coconis, Michel. ""Sentenced to the punishment of death": Pre-Furman capital crimes and executions in Shelby County, Tennessee", University of Memphis Law Review 31: 861–918, 2000–2001. Hosted by HeimOnline. (subscription required). For a free version, see here.
- Bond, Beverly G.; Sherman, Janann. (2003). Memphis: In Black and White, Arcadia Publishing, pp. 85–86. ISBN 0-7385-2441-7.
- Tennessee Historical Quarterly (Tennessee Historical Society) 63 (1–4), 2004. Google Books.
- Young, Darius. "The Lynching of Ell Persons and the Rise of the Memphis N.A.A.C.P.", paper presented at the annual meeting of the Association for the Study of African American Life and History, 26 September 2006. Hosted at allacademic.com. (subscription required)
- Mays, David J.; Sweeney, James R. (ed.) (2008). Race, Reason, and Massive Resistance: The Diary of David J. Mays, 1954–1959, University of Georgia Press, p. 3.
- DeCosta-Willis, Miriam (2008). Notable Black Memphians, Cambria Press. ISBN 978-1-60497-505-5.

== Media ==
- Stinson Liles (June 19, 2017). "Broad Daylight". Southern Hollows (podcast).
- Thrailkill, Thomas Murder on the Macon Road Memphis in Mourning. BookBaby Publishing. ISBN 979-8-3178-0025-3
