= East St. Louis massacre =

1917 massacre of Black Americans by white mob in East St. Louis, Illinois

- Part of the nadir of American race relations
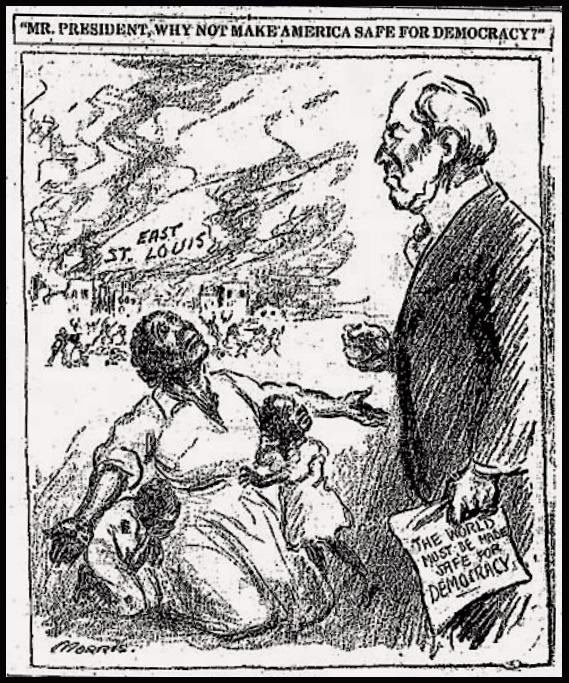
- 1917 political cartoon on the massacre. The caption reads, "Mr. President, why not make America safe for democracy?", referring to President Woodrow Wilson's catch-phrase "The world must be made safe for democracy".
- Date: May 28 and July 1–3, 1917
- Location: East St. Louis, Illinois; 38°37′20″N 90°09′30″W
- Caused by: Conflict between Southern African Americans working at East St. Louis plants and ethnic immigrants from Europe.
- Methods: African Americans beaten to death, shot, lynched, and driven into burning buildings by whites

Casualties
- Deaths: 39–150 Black Americans, 9 white Americans

The East St. Louis massacre was a series of violent attacks by White Americans against African Americans in East St. Louis, Illinois, from late May to early July 1917. The riots displaced some 6,000 African Americans and led to the destruction of property worth about $400,000 ($10.05 million in 2025). The particularly violent July 1917 episode was one of the worst racial riots in U.S. history; author Robert Fitch called it the "worst case of labor-related violence in 20th-century American history".

The massacre drew national attention. At the end of July, some 10,000 Black citizens marched in silent protest in New York City. Many Black people left East St. Louis; when area public schools opened in the fall, Black enrollment had dropped by 35%.

== Background ==
Location of East St. Louis in Illinois

In 1917, many would-be workers were drafted or enlisted into military service for World War I., creating a shortage of labor for industrial employers in major cities, which had long been destinations for European immigrants. Concurrently, African Americans began the Great Migration from the rural Southern United States to seek better work and education in the North, as well as to escape from lynchings and the second-class status of the Jim Crow era. Labor agencies recruited some workers for specific jobs, especially as strikebreakers, but labor demand was sufficient that migrants moved on their own, having heard about the new employment opportunities created by the wartime economy. The neighboring communities of St. Louis, Missouri, and East St. Louis, Illinois, became destinations for southern migrants. During the spring of 1917, Black people were arriving in St. Louis at the rate of 2,000 per week.

East St. Louis is an industrial city across the Mississippi River from St. Louis. Major industries there included Aluminum Ore Company, American Steel Foundry, Republic Iron & Steel, Obear Nester Glass, and Elliot Frog & Switch (a frog was part of a railroad switch). Many facilities were located just outside the city limits in order to escape paying taxes. Nearby National City had stockyards and meatpacking plants, attracting more workers. East St. Louis was a rough industrial city, where saloons outnumbered schools and churches. Non-whites were initially a small minority: in 1910, about 6,000 African Americans lived in East St. Louis, of a total population of 58,000. By 1917, the Black population had increased to about 20,000 out of almost 100,000 total.

The period saw frequent labor violence in industrial cities across the United States: employers used force to suppress organized labor and strikes, while workers struggled to gain increased wages and improved working conditions. Many workers were immigrants from Europe. When industries became embroiled in labor strikes, the traditionally white unions often sought to strengthen their bargaining positions by hindering or excluding Black workers. Conversely, industry owners hired Black people as replacements or strikebreakers, deepening existing segregation and inter-racial hostility. Ethnicities competed economically to survive. White workers often resented Black newcomers due to competition for jobs and housing and fear they would be undercut by Black workers willing to accept lower wages. In East St. Louis, local politicians, company foremen, and labor union officials fanned the resentment; the approval of the local police and National Guard were later considered important in helping to escalate the rioting. The Springfield race riot of 1908 in nearby Springfield, Illinois, had been an expression of the racial bitterness in the region during the nadir of race relations.

While in New Orleans on a lecture tour, Jamaican Black nationalist Marcus Garvey, who founded the UNIA in 1916, became aware that Louisiana planters and the city's Board of Trade were worried about losing their labor force. In a speech the following year, he said that Mayor Fred Mollman of East St. Louis had been visiting New Orleans the same week, and city leaders had asked for his assistance to help discourage Black migration to the North.

In the summer of 1916, 2,500 white employees of the meatpacking industry near East St. Louis went on strike for higher wages, and the companies imported Black workers as strikebreakers to replace them. Ultimately the workers won a wage increase but the companies retained nearly 800 Black people, firing as many white people after the strike, according to the former president of the Central Trades and Labor Union of East St. Louis. This exacerbated the growing racial tension.

In the spring of 1917, the mostly white workers of the Aluminum Ore Company in East St. Louis voted to strike. The company recruited hundreds of Black workers to replace them. Tensions between the groups escalated. At a labor meeting held in City Hall on May 28 and made up mostly of white workers, rumors circulated of Black men fraternizing with white women.

== Violence ==
Following the May 28 meeting, some 1,000–3,000 white men marched into downtown East St. Louis and began attacking African Americans on the street and in streetcars, and burning some buildings. Illinois Governor Frank Orren Lowden called in the National Guard to suppress the violence. Although rumors circulated that the Black people were planning retaliatory attacks, conditions eased somewhat for a few weeks.

Following the May disorder, the East St. Louis Central Labor Council requested an investigation by the State Council of Defense. Its report said that "southern negroes were misled by false advertisements and unscrupulous employment agents to come to East St. Louis in such numbers under false pretenses of secure jobs and decent living quarters". State Council of Defense member John Walker endorsed a claim that employers were importing Black southern migrants to destroy labor organizations.

The riot was precipitated by fatal errors. On July 1, a black Ford Model T occupied by white males drove through a Black area of the city; passengers fired several shots into a group on the street. An hour later, a Ford containing four people, including a journalist and two police officers (Detective Sergeant Samuel Coppedge and Detective Frank Wadley), passed through the same area. Black residents, possibly assuming this car held the original attackers, opened fire on the car, killing one officer instantly and mortally wounding another.

The next day, thousands of white spectators gathered to view the detectives' bloodstained automobile. From there they rushed into the Black sections of town, south and west of the city, and began rioting. The mob beat and shot Black people on the street indiscriminately, including women and children. After cutting the water hoses of the fire department, white rioters burned entire sections of the city and shot Black residents as they escaped the flames. Claiming that "Southern negros deserve[d] a genuine lynching", some whites hanged several Black people.

The following day on July 3, 1917, a reporter from the St. Louis Post-Dispatch wrote: "For an hour and a half last evening I saw the massacre of helpless negroes at Broadway and Fourth Street, in downtown East St. Louis, where black skin was death warrant."

== Eyewitness accounts ==
Reporting for the St. Louis Republic, journalist Hugh L. Wood described the brutal beating of an unidentified Black man fleeing a burning neighborhood. The account, later quoted in The Crisis, was among the most graphic contemporary descriptions of the violence.

The Crisis reported several additional incidents that illustrated the brutality of the violence. One report described a person who was killed by decapitation with a butcher knife. Another account involved a 12-year-old black girl who collapsed after being forced off a trolley. When her mother stopped to assist her, a group of white attackers assaulted the woman, leaving her on the ground with a severe head wound.

=== Police response ===
According to the St. Louis Post-Dispatch:

All the impartial witnesses agree that the police were either indifferent or encouraged the barbarities, and that the major part of the National Guard was indifferent or inactive. No organized effort was made to protect the Negroes or disperse the murdering groups. The lack of frenzy and of a large infuriated mob made the task easy. Ten determined officers could have prevented most of the outrages. One hundred men acting with authority and vigor might have prevented any outrage.

Hundreds of Black people fled across the Eads Bridge over the Mississippi River to St. Louis to escape the violence, while 1,500 sought refuge in city buildings. St. Louis institutions worked to help the refugees, including the St. Louis chapter of the Red Cross, the Provident Association, and the Jewish Education and Charitable Association, as well as related charities. The Red Cross Emergency Committee met daily with Acting Mayor Aloe, members of his administration, and representatives of the charities to discuss how to aid the refugees.

Governor Lowden ordered in the Illinois National Guard, who arrived on July 3. Numerous witnesses said that the Guard initially joined in the attacks on Black people rather than stopping the riot. More whites joined in. The New York Times reported that "ten or fifteen young girls about 18 years old, chased a negro woman at the Relay Depot at about 5 o'clock. The girls were brandishing clubs and calling upon the men to kill the woman."

Few photographs exist of the events, as rioters attacked photographers and destroyed their cameras, and city police harassed journalists. After the massacre, the St. Louis Argus said, "The entire country has been aroused to a sense of shame and pity by the magnitude of the national disgrace enacted by the blood-thirsty rioters in East St. Louis Monday, July 2."

== Aftermath ==
=== Death toll ===
After the riot, varying estimates of the death toll circulated. The police chief estimated that 100 African Americans had been killed. The renowned journalist Ida B. Wells reported in The Chicago Defender that 40 to 150 African-American people were killed during the July bloodshed. The National Association for the Advancement of Colored People (NAACP) estimated deaths at 100 to 200.

A Congressional investigating committee that met in the fall of that year concluded that no precise death toll could be determined, but reported that at least 8 whites and 39 African Americans died. They noted that the local coroner had documented nine white deaths, but the deaths of African-American victims were less clearly recorded. Activists who disputed the committee's conclusions about deaths argued that the true number of deaths would never be known because many Black corpses were not recovered or did not pass through the hands of undertakers, who reported to the coroner.

Some 6,000 African Americans were left homeless after their neighborhoods were burned.

=== Black community's reaction ===
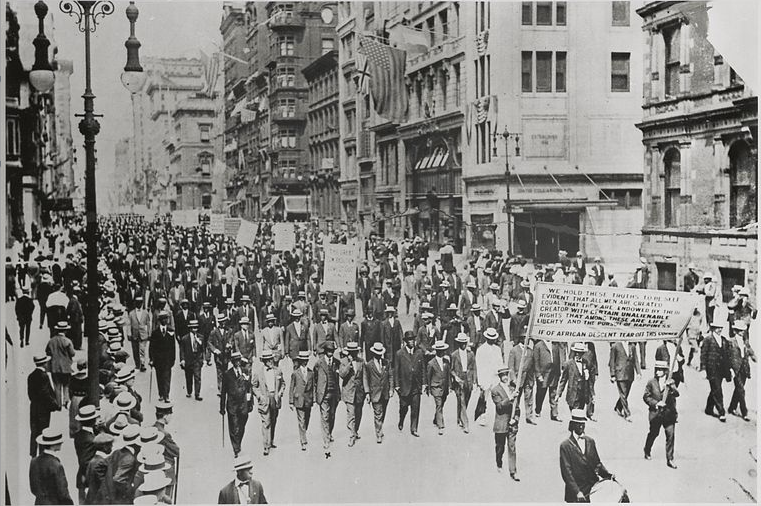
Photo of the Silent Parade protest march in New York City (July 28, 1917)

The ferocious brutality of the attacks and the failure of authorities to protect civilian lives contributed to the radicalization of many Black people in St. Louis and the nation. Marcus Garvey, black nationalist leader of the UNIA from Jamaica, declared in a July 8 speech that the riot proved that the United States' claim to be a "dispenser of democracy" and its criticism of the Empire of Germany for human rights abuses in the Great War was hypocritical. Garvey called the violence "one of the bloodiest outrages against mankind" and a "wholesale massacre of our people", insisting that "This is no time for fine words, but a time to lift one's voice against the savagery of a people who claim to be the dispensers of democracy."

In New York City on July 28, ten thousand black people marched down Fifth Avenue in a Silent Parade, protesting the East St. Louis Riot. They carried signs that highlighted protests about the riot. The march was organized by the NAACP (then based in New York), leader W. E. B. Du Bois, and groups in Harlem. Women and children were dressed in white; the men were dressed in black. The NAACP had arranged for journalists to photograph the destruction in East St. Louis left behind after the riot: houses, stores, churches, and brick warehouses were all left in ruins. These photographs were published in the September 1917 issue of The Crisis, the organization's magazine.

=== Business community's reaction ===
On July 6, representatives of the East St. Louis Chamber of Commerce met with the mayor to demand the resignation of the Police Chief and Night Police Chief, or radical reform. The chief had ordered officers not to shoot the white rioters and they were unable to suppress the violence and the destruction as a result. The Chamber members accused the mayor of having allowed a "reign of lawlessness".

In addition to the high death toll, the riot had caused extensive property damage to city businesses and houses. The Southern Railway Company's warehouse was burned, with the loss of more than 100 carloads of merchandise; some 44 freight cars, and 312 houses were also burned. A white-owned theatre, valued at more than $100,000, was also destroyed. Total property damage was estimated at $400,000 (equivalent to $10.05 million in 2025).

=== Government's reaction ===
In a mass meeting in Carnegie Hall on July 12 in New York City, Samuel Gompers, the president of the American Federation of Labor, tried to diminish the role in the massacre attributed to trade unions. He said that an investigation was needed in order to place blame. Theodore Roosevelt, former president of the United States, responded, "Mr. Gompers, why don't I accuse afterwards? I'll answer now, when murder is to be answered." Roosevelt also was reported to say, "I will go to the extreme to bring justice to the laboring man, but when there is murder I will put him down."

Congressman Leonidas C. Dyer (R-Mo.), a representative from a St. Louis urban district, asked for a federal investigation. President Woodrow Wilson wrote to him on July 28, saying that special agents of the Department of Justice could not find enough evidence to justify federal action in the matter. He said: "I am informed that the attorney general of the State of Illinois has gone to East St. Louis to add his efforts to those of the officials of the county and city in pressing prosecutions under the State laws. The representatives of the Department of Justice are so far as possible lending aid to the State authorities in their efforts to restore tranquility and guard against further outbreaks."

Hearings on the massacre before the Committee on Rules and the House of Representatives began on August 3, 1917. The lack of a full federal investigation damaged Black morale though.

In October the state tried 25 Black people and 10 whites on charges related to the massacre, including homicide and incitement to riot. Lena Cook survived an attack to testify against three white men, who had killed her husband, Ed Cook, and son, 14-year-old Lurizza Beard. While not charged with the deaths of Cook's family, John Dow, Charles Hanna, and Harry Robinson were tried for the murder of William Keyser, a white merchant who'd been killed by a bullet which passed through the body of Lurizza Beard. Dow and Hanna were both convicted of murder and each sentenced to 15 years in prison. Harry Robinson later pleaded guilty to conspiracy to riot and was sentenced to 5 years in prison. On October 12, 1917, two whites, Herbert Wood, 40, and Leo Keane, 17, were convicted of murder in the lynching of Scott Clark, a Black man. Wood and Keane had grabbed Clark, fastened a noose around his neck, and dragged him through the street. They were stopped and arrested by police, but Clark later died of his injuries. The prosecution demanded a death sentence for Wood and a long prison term for Keane. However, the jury instead fixed the sentences at 14 years, the same punishment recently imposed on ten Black men who had been convicted of murdering a white police officer during the riots.

Included among the defendants was Dr. LeRoy Bundy, a Black dentist and prominent leader in the East St. Louis Black community. He was formally charged with inciting a riot. The trial was held in the county court of St. Clair County, Illinois. Bundy, along with 34 other defendants, of whom 10 were white, was convicted and sentenced to prison in connection with the riot. Another source said that a total of nine whites and twelve Black people were convicted of serious crimes and sent to prison. Richard Brockway, a key ringleader of the riots, was convicted of conspiring to riot and sentenced to five years in prison.

== See also ==
- List of incidents of civil unrest in the United States
- List of homicides in Illinois § Lynchings and race riots
- Mass racial violence in the United States

== Sources ==
- Barnes, Harper. Never Been a Time: The 1917 Race Riot That Sparked the Civil Rights Movement, New York: Walker & Company, June 24, 2008. ISBN 0-8027-1575-3.
- Fitch, Robert. Solidarity for Sale. Cambridge, Mass.: Perseus Books Group, 2006. ISBN 1-891620-72-X.
- Gibson, Robert A. The Negro Holocaust: Lynching and Race Riots in the United States, 1880–1950. New Haven: Yale University, 1979.
- Heaps, Willard A. "Target of Prejudice: The Negro", In Riots, USA 1765–1970. New York: The Seabury Press, 1970.
- James, Winston. Holding Aloft the Banner of Ethiopia: Caribbean Radicalism in Early Twentieth-century America, Verso, 1998
- Leonard, Mary Delach. "E. St. Louis Riot." St. Louis Post-Dispatch. January 13, 2004.
- Lumpkins, Charles L. American Pogrom: The East St. Louis Race Riot and Black Politics. Athens, Ohio: Ohio University Press, 2008. ISBN 978-0-8214-1802-4, ISBN 0-8214-1802-5.
- McLaughlin, Malcolm. Power, Community, and Racial Killing in East St. Louis. New York: Palgrave Macmillan, 2005. ISBN 1-4039-7078-5. excerpt
- McLaughlin, Malcolm. "Reconsidering the East St Louis Race Riot of 1917", International Review of Social History. 47:2 (August 2002).
- "Race Rioters Fire East St. Louis and Shoot or Hang Many Negroes". The New York Times. July 3, 1917.
- Patrick, James. "The Horror of the East St. Louis Massacre." Exodus. February 22, 2000.
- Rudwick, Elliott M. Race Riot at East St. Louis. Carbondale, Ill.: Southern Illinois University Press, 1964.
- Wells, Ida B. Crusade for Justice: The Autobiography of Ida B. Wells. Rev. edn. Chicago: University of Chicago Press, 1991. ISBN 0-226-89344-8.
