= Frederick Asbury Cullen =

Civil rights activist and clergyman

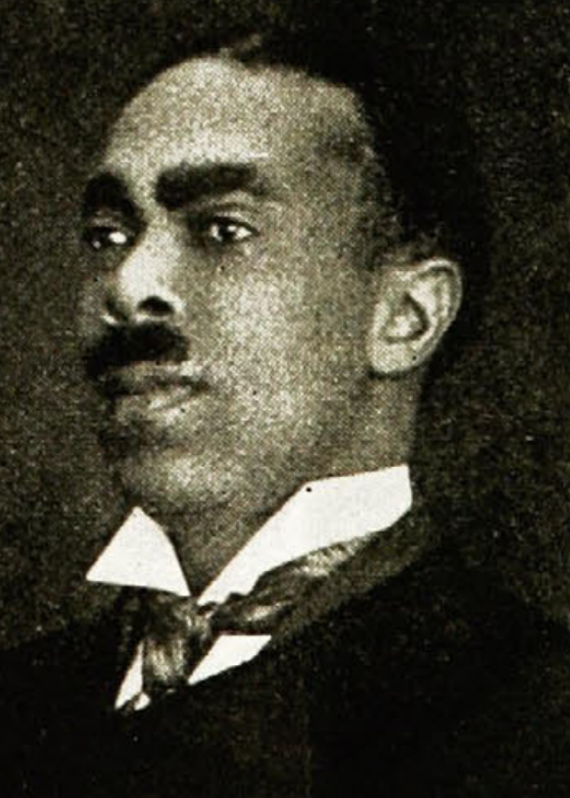
- c.1920
- Born: 1868; Fairmount, Maryland, United States
- Died: 25 May 1946 (aged 77–78)
- Occupation: Methodist Episcopal Minister
- Spouse: Carolyn Belle Mitchell

Frederick Asbury (F.A.) Cullen (c. 1868– May 25, 1946) was an American Methodist minister, community and civil rights activist, based in Harlem, New York City. He supported legal and social protests, and was influential in working with the youth of his community.

== Early life and family ==
Frederick Asbury Cullen's parents were Isaac and Emmeline Williams Cullen. They had both been enslaved. Frederick Asbury Cullen was born c. 1868, in Fairmount, Maryland.

Sometime before 1919, he married Carolyn Belle Mitchell (d. 1932), a soprano and pianist from Baltimore. They worked together in the Church. They had one unofficially adopted child, Countee LeRoy Porter, who assumed the Reverend's last name. Countee Cullen was a poet, and is regarded as a notable member of the Harlem Renaissance.

== Career ==
It is said that his religious awakening occurred at Baltimore's Sharp Street Methodist Episcopal Church, in September 1894. He was ordained as a Methodist minister in 1900 in Delaware County, Maryland. (The Methodist Episcopal Church was the forerunner of the Methodist Church (1939) and the United Methodist Church (1968)). He successfully led a two church circuit in Catlin, Maryland from 1900 to 1902. Later, he was assigned to St. Mark's Church, a congregation of mostly Black parishioners in New York's East Village. The church had a storefront mission in Harlem, Salem Chapel. He reached out to children as a means of getting their parents involved in the church. His success in recruiting led to the mission being elevated to an independent entity in 1908, becoming the Salem Methodist Episcopal Church. He led this church for 40 years.

He was president of the Harlem branch of the NAACP. He was vice president for the historic 1917 Negro Silent Protest Parade.
