= Black comedy (disambiguation) =

Black comedy is a style of comedy that makes light of subject matter that is generally considered taboo.

Black comedy or Black Comedy may also refer to:

- Black Comedy (play), by Peter Shaffer, 1965
- Black Comedy (TV series), an Australian sketch comedy series
- Black Comedy (film), a 2014 Hong Kong film
- Comedy (Black album), 1988

== See also ==
- African American comedy
- Black sitcom, a sitcom that mainly features black people in the cast
- Blaxploitation, an ethnic subgenre of the exploitation film
- Kenny Larkin, who also releases as Dark Comedy, an American techno producer
- Shakespearean problem play, whose tone shifts violently between comic and dark, psychological drama
