= Elizabeth Williams (actress) =

American actress

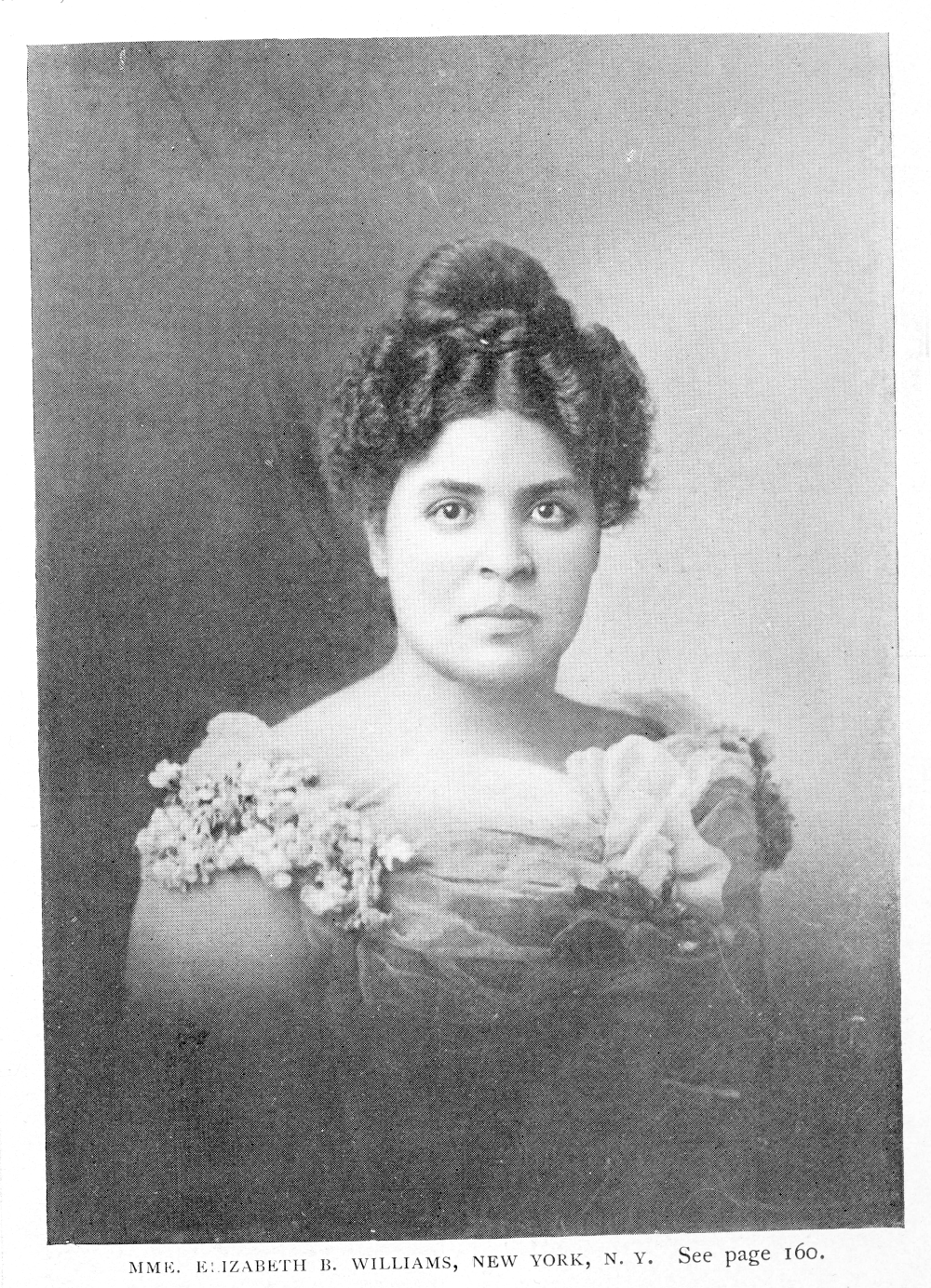
Mme. Elizabeth B. Williams, c. 1900

Elizabeth Williams was an American stage actress and theater impresario who was actively performing during the first half of the 20th century. She was part of the first generation of black actresses in the dramatic repertory on the American stage, and is believed to be one of the first African-American women to establish her own stock theatre company, the Oriental Empire Stock Company, in 1902. She later was an active member of the Lafayette Stock Company in Harlem. In addition to her work in stage plays, she also performed in Broadway musicals.

== Career ==
Williams was part of the first generation of black actresses to achieve success in the dramatic repertory on the American stage. She established the Oriental Empire Stock Company, an all-black repertory theatre troupe, in 1902. It was possibly the first stock theatre company established by an African-American woman. The company gave its first performance on October 16, 1902, at Ebling's Casino in New York City; presenting Colin Henry Hazlewood's stage adaptation of the novel Lady Audley's Secret with Williams in the title role. The company continued to give performances in New York City at the Murray Hill Lyceum in 1903, and the Palm Garden Theatre in 1904. It was still active as late as 1905. She later was an active member of the Lafayette Stock Company in Harlem; a ground-breaking theatre company in the history of African-American theatre.

On Broadway, Williams made her debut at the Grand Opera House in 1907 as Aunt Phoebe Jackson in the J. Rosamond Johnson and Bob Cole musical The Shoo-Fly Regiment (1907). In 1909 she portrayed Lucretia Martin in the Johnson and Cole musical The Red Moon. In 1926 she originated the role of Mrs. Bowtelle in Edward Sheldon and Charles MacArthur's hit Broadway play Lulu Belle. She starred in two more plays on Broadway; portraying Aunt Rebecca in Ernest Howard Culbertson's Goat Alley (1927, Princess Theatre) and Ma Williams in William Jourdan Rapp's Harlem (1930, Eltinger Theatre).
