= Lulu Belle =

Lulu Belle may refer to:

- Lulu Belle (musical), a 1926 musical directed by David Belasco
- Lulu Belle and Scotty, a country music act of the 1930s and 1940s, dubbed The Sweethearts of Country Music
- Lulu Belle (film), a 1948 film starring Dorothy Lamour, George Montgomery, and Glenda Farrell
