= My Castle on the Nile =

American song

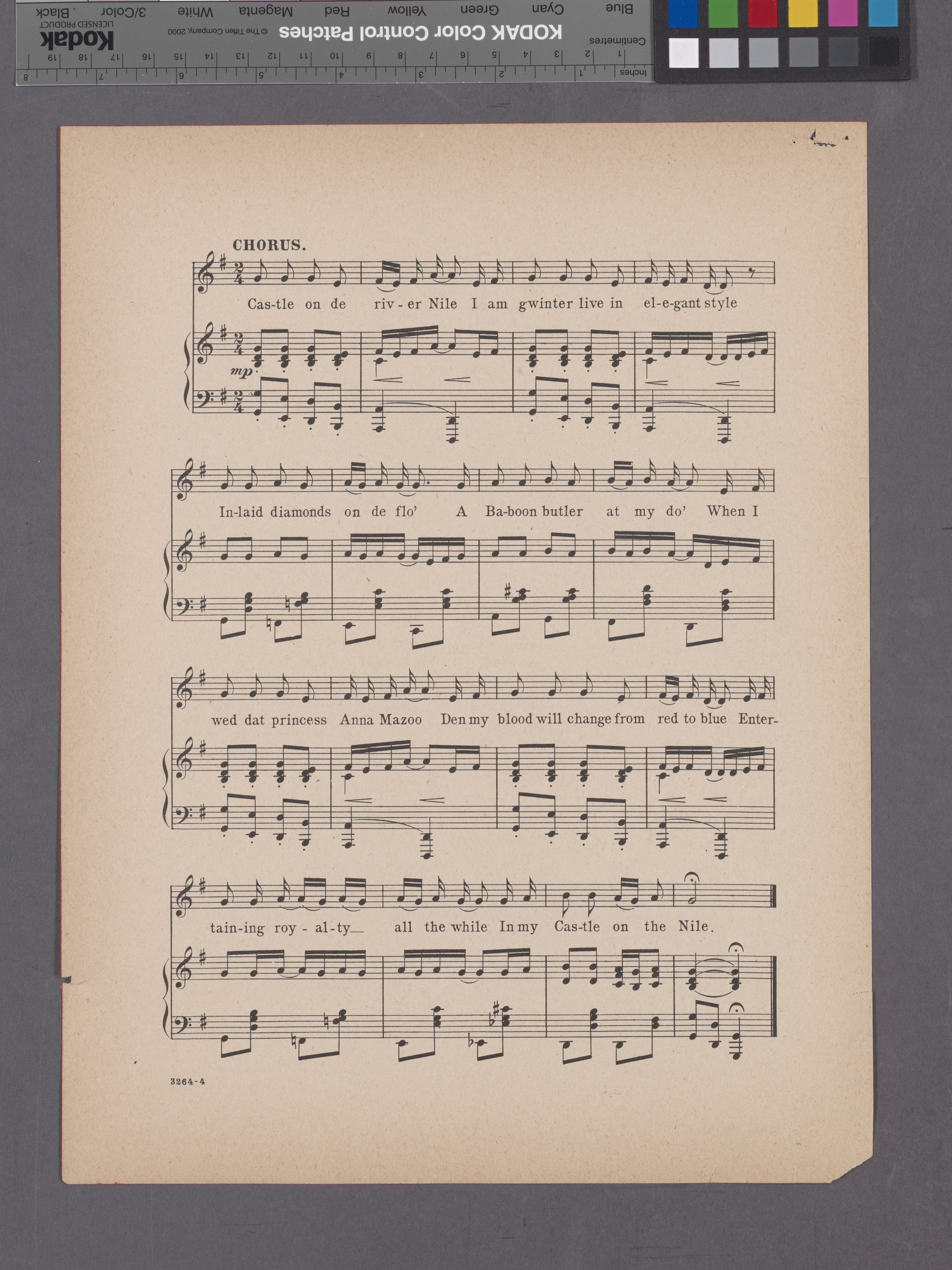
Chorus

My Castle on the Nile is an American song with lyrics by Bob Cole and James Weldon Johnson and music by J. Rosamond Johnson. Arthur Collins was recorded on a Columbia Records wax cylinder performing the song in 1902. Various artists have recorded it since.

The New York Public Library has a musical score for it as "Sung By The Great Comedian Bert Williams." The University of Maine Library also has a score for it published by Jos. W. Stern & Co. in 1901. It is also held by other libraries.

Bert Williams recorded the song on Victor. It was recorded by the Wonder State Harmonists on Vocalion records in 1929. The War Department recorded The Camp Hill Male Quartet performing it and "Little Liza I Love You" on a 1945 album.

== See also ==
- Coon song
- Ragtime
- African American comedy
