= The Red Moon (Johnson and Cole) =

1908 musical by J. Rosamund Johnson and Bob Cole

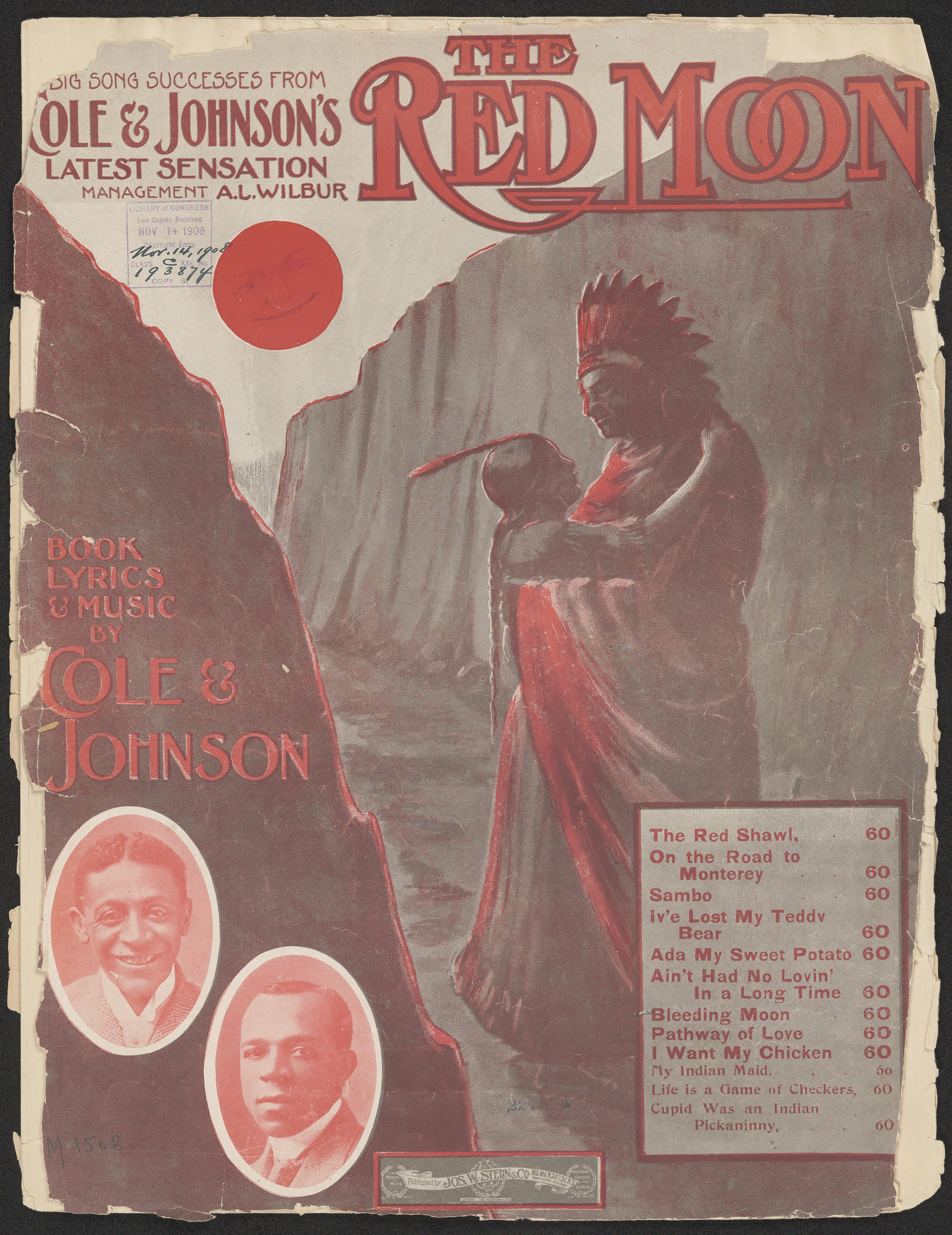
- Front cover of the 1908 sheet music for the song "Bleeding Moon" from The Red Moon
- Music: J. Rosamund Johnson
- Lyrics: Bob Cole
- Book: Bob Cole
- Premiere: August 31, 1908: Wilmington, Delaware
- Productions: 1908-10 US tour

The Red Moon is a musical or operetta in three acts with music by J. Rosamund Johnson and both book and lyrics by Bob Cole. Additional music was contributed by James Reese Europe who composed the song "Sambo" for the show, and co-wrote the song "Ada (My Sweet Potater)" with Cole and lyrics by Charles A. Hunter. Labeled and marketed by its creators as a "sensation in red and black", the work has been classified variously by theatre scholars as a musical and an operetta. The show was created by African Americans and starred an all-Black cast in its original 1908–10 production. The show is regarded as historically important to American theatre because it was the first Broadway show to depict alliances between African Americans and Native Americans.

== Plot ==
The Red Moon is set in the fictional town of Swamptown, Virginia, and on an Indian reservation somewhere in the Rocky Mountains. The story follows a young half-African-American and half-Native-American woman, Minnehaha, who has recently graduated from the Swamptown Institute. This fictional school is based on the Hampton Institute; a historically Black college now known as Hampton University.

Minnehaha lives with her African American mother, Lucretia Martin, on a Virginia farm. They are visited by her father, Indian Chief Lowdog, who abandoned his wife Lucretia when Minnehaha was three years old. Lowdog is perturbed by his daughter's pretentious manners, vanity, and condescending social airs. Along with Indian brave and Swamptown graduate Red Feather, Lowdog kidnaps Minnehaha and takes her back home to the reservation, but she rebels from assimilating into Native life. Minnehaha is romantically pursued by Red Feather, but desires instead to return to Swamptown to reunite with her boyfriend, Plunk Green.

Meanwhile, Plunk Green and his pianist friend Slim Brown decide they must rescue Minnehaha, and the two arrive at the reservation disguised as a lawyer and a doctor. A rivalry for Minnehaha's heart forms between Plunk Green and Red Feather; forming a central love triangle within the plot. After several misadventures Plunk Green and Slim Brown succeed in outwitting Lowdog and Red Feather, and bring Minnehaha happily back home to Swamptown. Chief Lowdog and Lucretia Martin reconcile and their marriage is rekindled. The show ends with Minnehaha and Plunk Green's wedding.

== History ==
The opening setting at the Swamptown school is based on the historically Black college Hampton University. At the time this show was written, Hampton had in the recent past been transformed into a biracial institution for blacks and Native Americans with the support of Booker T. Washington who taught classes in the new biracial environment. This decision to adopt biracial education drew criticism from some individuals in white society who feared unification between Blacks and Native Americans could lead to violence and insurrection. The Red Moon opens its story in this biracial education environment, and presents a picture of the value of both higher education and unity between African Americans and Native Americans.

Cole used his own Black Seminole ancestry to inform the crafting of The Red Moon, and care was taken to authentically represent both Native American and African American folklore and culture. Emphasis was placed on shared religious beliefs and commonalities in folklore between the two people groups. The title of The Red Moon was taken from traditional beliefs about the red moon or "harvest moon" in Native and African American cultures. The 'red moon' is a bad omen in African American folklore and is seen as a call to war in some Native American traditions. The name of the half African American and Native American main character, Minnehaha, is taken from the Dakota language and means "waterfall".

The Red Moon was created at a time when operetta was at the height of its popularity on the American stage. Franz Lehár's The Merry Widow had been a tremendous success on Broadway in 1907, and this work prompted the creation of many American operettas in its immediate wake, including Cole and Johnson's The Red Moon. Inspired by the Indianist movement of the early 20th century, the music of the show blended Native American music with the classical idioms of European operetta along with the popular styles of Tin Pan Alley, and the ballad and dialect songs of Broadway musicals and minstrel shows. Examples of this include the song "Bleeding Moon", which told the story of an Indian curse and the Native American love song "The Big Red Shawl".

As with their previous shows, Cole and Johnson crafted the work with starring roles for themselves, creating the comic duo of Plunk Green (Cole) and Slim Brown (Johnson). In addition to Cole and Johnson, the all-Black cast of The Red Moon included operatic soprano Abbie Mitchell as Minnehaha, Arthur Talbot as Chief Lowdog, Elizabeth Williams as Lucretia Martin, Andrew Tribble as Lily White, Theodore Pankey as Red Feather, and Fanny Wise as Truscalina White Nakomis among others. The show was directed by Cole who may have also choreographed the work. The musical forces were led under the direction of James Reese Europe. Europe, who wrote the music to two of the show's songs, "Sambo" and "Ada (My Sweet Potater)", also contributed some instrumental melodies to the show's score; although the majority of the music was written by Johnson.

In March 1909, after performing the work in Montreal, the company toured the show to the nearby Caugnawago Reservation on the St. Lawrence River as guests of Chief Mitchal Dial Bount and performed the work to an audience of Iroquois people. Johnson was later made a sub-chief of this Iroquois tribe in 1921 in recognition of his efforts to "dignify stage representations of Indians".

The Red Moon's tour reached Broadway's Majestic Theatre on May 3, 1909, where it ran for a total of 32 performances; closing on May 29, 1909. Wilbur was one of the owners of this theater. Critical reaction to the work was mixed; with several white critics in particular complaining that the work incorporated Native American and "white" music and theatre styles into a Black show. The New York Times dismissed the show's plot as "flimsy and uninteresting", but praised the performances of its stars and the music. The Indianapolis Freeman gave a favorable appraisal of the show, its sets and costumes, performers, and songs.

== Reception ==
Virginia Tech Africana Studies professor Paula Marie Seniors stated that "The Red Moon introduced audiences to African American and Native American solidarity"; and that it "provided audiences with the first rendering of African American and Native American alliances on Broadway." It was the first stage work in the history of American theatre to feature romantic relationships between African Americans and Native Americans.

Musical theatre scholar Dan Dietz described The Red Moon as a "popular road musical". The show toured the United States from 1908 to 1910. It was first performed in Wilmington, Delaware, on August 31, 1908; after which it toured to other cities. The show was produced by A. L. Wilbur; a producer who was known for backing productions of comic operas and operettas with the Wilbur Opera Company.

== Operetta or musical? ==
Scholarship on The Red Moon has been divided on whether the work should be labeled as an operetta or a musical comedy. The creators of The Red Moon did not designate whether their work was an operetta or a musical, but instead labeled the piece as a "sensation in red and black". Historian Bernard L. Peterson, a widely recognized authority of African American theatre, labeled the work an operetta while simultaneously acknowledging that the work could be considered a musical comedy. The Cambridge Companion to the Musical stated that "although a few of the songs are reflective of the earlier ragtime genre, many are written as art songs, similar to those of Amy Beach, George W. Chadwick, and Reginald De Koven, making The Red Moon more of an operetta than a musical comedy."

Musicologist and ragtime authority David A Jasen and African American music historian Gene Jones stated that The Red Moon "was American operetta at its best" and drew a through line to the work's creation to Franz Lehár's The Merry Widow. However, these scholars also described the work as "a fresh amalgamation of 'Indian music', Tin Pan Alley syncopation, ballads, and dialect numbers". Cultural historian Robert Letellier also labeled the work an operetta, and included the work in his compendium of American operettas Operetta, A Sourcebook, Volume II (2015, Cambridge Scholars Publishing). The work has also been labeled an operetta in The Music of Black Americans: A History (Cambridge University Press, 1997), The Garland Encyclopedia of World Music, and An Inconvenient Black History of British Musical Theatre 1900 - 1950 (2021, Bloomsbury Publishing) among other academic publications.

In contrast, ShanghaiTech University professor Peter Raccuglia labeled the work as a musical in his 2022 journal article in American Quarterly, "An American Musical in Red and Black". James Reese Europe biographer Reid Badger also labeled the work a musical comedy. The work has also been described as a musical comedy in The A to Z of African American Theater (2009, Scarecrow Press), Racial Uplift and American Music, 1878-1943 (2012, University Press of Mississippi), and The Complete Book of 1900s Broadway Musicals (2022, Rowman & Littlefield Publishers) among other academic works.

Other writers on the work have avoided labeling the work a musical or operetta altogether. Theatre historians Gerald Bordman and Richard C. Norton in American Musical Theatre: A Chronicle (2010, Oxford University Press) simply describe the work as "a Black show". Cleveland State University professor of African American, African Diaspora, and American Cultural History Karen Sotiropoulos noted that The Red Moon was criticized by white critics for being "too white" because of its adoption of art forms other than stereotypical black musical comedy.

== Musical numbers ==
The following is a list of the musical numbers at the time of the Broadway run of The Red Moon.

Act 1

- "Opening Chorus"
- "Life Is a Game of Checkers"
- "Keep on Smilin"
- "Don't Tell Tales Out of School"
- "I Love But You"
- "Ada (My Sweet Potater)" (music by Bob Cole and James Reese Europe; lyrics by Charles A. Hunter)
- "Finale"

Act 2

- "Prelude"
- "Bleeding Moon"
- "The Big Red Shawl"
- "The Pathway of Love"
- "On the Road to Monterey"
- "War Dance"

Act 3

- "Red Moon To-da-lo"
- "Sambo" (music by James Reese Europe)
- "Pianologue"
- "Run, Billy Possum, Run"
- "I Ain't Had No Lovin' in a Long Time" (music by James Reese Europe)
- "Love Me, Baby Mine"

=== Additional songs ===
The following is a list of songs which were published, but were not present in the show at the time it was performed on Broadway.

- "Hoola woola"

== See also ==
- Development of musical theatre
