= Black sitcom =

Sitcom starring a predominant African American cast

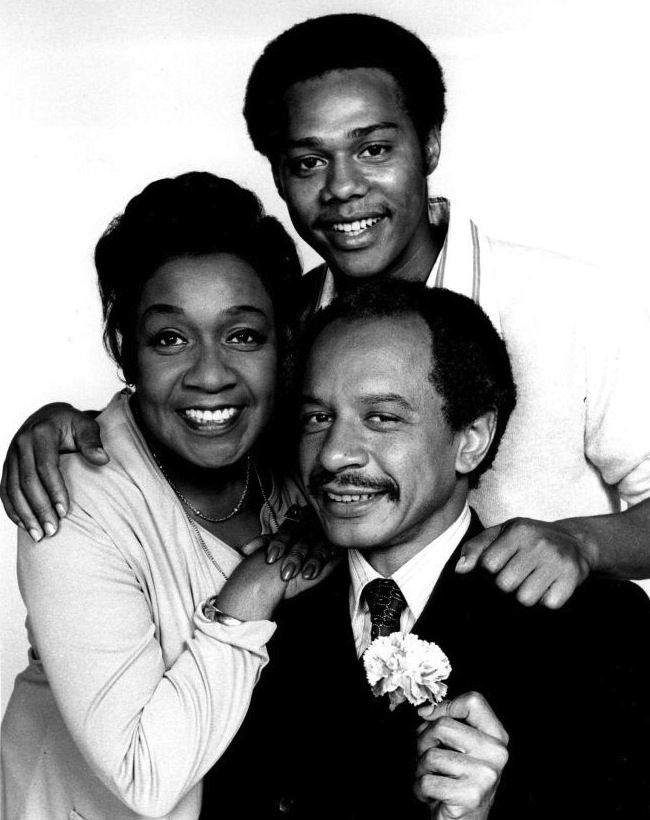
Cast of The Jeffersons, clockwise from top: Mike Evans, Sherman Hemsley, and Isabel Sanford (1975)

A Black sitcom is a sitcom that principally features Black people in its cast. Prominent Black sitcoms to date typically come from the United States with African American casts, forming a branch of African American comedy. Although sitcoms with primarily Black characters have been present since the earliest days of network television, this genre rose to prominence in the 1990s, mostly then on upstart networks outside the Big Three.

== History ==
=== Early twentieth century ===
In the early days of television, Black actors were often cast in stereotypical roles, often as comic clowns in a tradition tracing back to the genre of black minstrelsy popular in the early 20th century through the late 1940s or as servants, usually maids. In 1948, the sitcom, The Laytons starred singer and actress, Amanda Randolph. It was the first time a Black actor was a series regular on a network TV series in the United States. Randolph portrayed a problem solving maid to a white suburban family.

=== 1950s ===
The first television sitcom to principally portray black people, Amos 'n' Andy, was widely popular among diverse audiences. The actors on the original radio show were both White, but the 1951–53 CBS television show portrayed them with Black actors, and represented Black individuals as businesspeople, judges, lawyers and policemen. After over seventy episodes, it was taken off the air after protests from the NAACP and others who alleged that the show engaged in stereotyping. Beulah, a CBS radio sitcom 1945–54 and ABC television sitcom 1950–53, centered on a female Black character in a racially mixed cast and faced similar criticism.

=== 1960s ===
Julia (NBC, 1968–71) and Room 222 (ABC, 1969–74) each had a black performer as first-billed lead of a racially mixed cast. The Bill Cosby Show (NBC, 1969–71) had Cosby as its sole billed star. For her portrayal of Julia, actress Diahann Carroll became the first black woman to receive an Emmy nomination. Otherwise, after Amos 'n' Andy there were no new sitcoms with an all or mostly black permanent main cast in the U.S. until the 1970s.

=== 1970s ===
Several popular black sitcoms appeared in the 1970s, including Sanford and Son, Good Times, That's My Mama, The Jeffersons, and What's Happening!! While the sitcoms were widely popular among diverse audiences, celebrated black culture and addressed social issues, they were critiqued for an excess of loud and buffoonish characters, mostly in lower socioeconomic classes with the exception of The Jeffersons. Impressed with child actor Gary Coleman, the president of NBC created the sitcom Diff'rent Strokes specifically as a vehicle for him. Coleman would eventually become NBC's highest paid actor on a comedic series during its run. Although the series starred two black child actors and addressed social issues mainly from their perspective, it featured an otherwise all white cast and in retrospect has been criticized by some as a White Savior narrative. Good Times was adapted into the British sitcom The Fosters (ITV, 1976–77), one of the first British series with an all black cast.

=== 1980s ===
In the 1980s sitcoms such as The Cosby Show, A Different World, 227, and Frank's Place challenged stereotypical portrayals of black people, with subtler comedy and characterization and much increased representation of the black middle class. These series were well received with diverse audiences. The Cosby Show became the most-watched series of any genre on television for five consecutive seasons and in the top 20 for all its eight seasons.

=== 1990s ===
After the 1980s, the major American television networks appeared to lose interest in black sitcoms. In the 1990s, newer networks such as Fox, The WB and UPN, anxious to establish themselves with a black audience, featured black sitcoms such as Martin and Living Single, which drew high ratings among black households and were profitable even with a limited white viewership. Several black sitcoms of the 1990s were successful with both black and white audiences, especially family, adolescent, and young adult oriented series like Family Matters, The Fresh Prince of Bel-Air, Moesha, and Sister, Sister. Roc, about a working-class family, was critically acclaimed for combining comedy and drama with a cast led by theater veterans.

The WB released multiple sitcoms such as The Jamie Foxx Show, The Parent 'Hood, Smart Guy, The Wayans Bros., and The Steve Harvey Show. The Famous Jett Jackson also debuted on the Disney Channel along with Hangin' with Mr. Cooper on ABC. Beyond the sitcom format, In Living Color and Kenan & Kel innovated in sketch comedy, and Def Comedy Jam showcased black stand-up comedians. In Britain, Desmond's (1989–94) became the longest-running sitcom by number of episodes to originate on Channel 4.

=== 2000s ===
Black sitcoms in the 2000s experimented with genre conventions. The Bernie Mac Show and Everybody Hates Chris used single-camera setup and narration. The Boondocks, an adult animated sitcom made for cable television, ran four seasons intermittently from 2005 to 2014. Its blunt style and social critiques were sometimes controversial. It won an NAACP Image Award and Peabody Award. The Disney Channel also released the popular animated family sitcom, The Proud Family and That's So Raven, both of whom would see a revival and return to TV - That’s So Raven with Raven’s Home in the 2010s and The Proud Family with The Proud Family: Louder and Prouder in the 2020s.

From 1997 to 2001, the number of Black sitcoms on American television declined from 15 to 6 as white viewership declined, and that decline generally continued into the 2000s. Civil rights organizations accused networks of denying minorities equal opportunity as well as a broader participation in general television programming. The explosion of reality television and the decline of broadcast audience numbers in the 2000s also challenged the sitcom genre. In Canada, Da Kink in My Hair (Global, 2007–09) had a successful first season but ratings faltered after rescheduling for its second season.

=== 2010s ===
By the early 2010s, Black sitcoms had faded from broadcast television but there were signs of a comeback on cable including The Game, canceled by The CW in 2009 then renewed on BET, A.N.T. Farm on Disney Channel, Are We There Yet?, Tyler Perry's For Better Or Worse on TBS, Love That Girl! on TV One, and Let's Stay Together and Reed Between the Lines, on BET. Popular Black sitcoms from prior decades returned in reruns on BET, BET Her, Bounce TV, TV Land, TV One, MTV2, and TBS.

In 2012, Tyler Perry's House of Payne surpassed The Jeffersons to become the longest-running sitcom with a predominantly African-American cast by number of episodes.

Also in 2012, Debbie Allen, showrunner of A Different World from 1988 to 1993, wrote on Twitter that she wanted to reboot the series. Over a million people on Facebook, Twitter, and blogs reacted to the tweet signalling approval of the potential reboot.

In 2014, Black-ish premiered on ABC to over 11 million viewers and mostly positive reviews. The show addressed many current racial issues. Black-ish spawned the spin-offs Mixed-ish and Grown-ish, also with African-American leads and addressing racial issues.

=== 2020s ===
Abbott Elementary, a workplace comedy about the staff of a predominantly Black Philadelphia public school, debuted in 2021 on ABC. By its second season it was the network's most-watched comedy and received universal critical acclaim. The Wonder Years, ABC's 2021 series about a Black family in the 1960s – a reimagining of the 1988 series of the same name about a White family in the 1960s – lasted two seasons.

== Analysis ==
The favorite programs of television audiences tend to reflect their different ethnic origins and affinities. The exposure of the black community on American TV has been greater than that of other minorities but continues to reflect racial divisions within American society.

After American networks were criticized by the National Association for the Advancement of Colored People (NAACP) for a lack of racial diversity, drama shows, such as The West Wing, began casting more black characters.

From the 1980s to early 2000s, Black sitcoms such as The Cosby Show, Family Matters, Living Single, Moesha, and One on One, showed an evolution of how the lives of African Americans were portrayed.

Black sitcoms feature highly in the black audience's top 10 programs but have limited success with white audiences, attributed by Doug Alligood, senior vice-president at the advertising agency BBDO which has analyzed ratings figures, to the failure of humor to translate. The high ratings achieved by The Cosby Show have been ascribed to humor that has appealed to both whites and blacks. Black households make up over 20 percent of regular TV viewers.
