= Harlem: A Melodrama of Negro Life in Harlem =

1929 play by Wallace Thurman

Harlem: A Melodrama of Negro Life in Harlem is a 1929 play by Wallace Thurman. One of its original titles was Black Mecca and another was Black Belt. The play was loosely based on Thurman's short story "Cordelia the Crude". The play was written with Thurman's friend William Jourdan Rapp. It opened at the Apollo Theater and was successful, featuring a depiction of a migrant family coming to New York for a better life but meeting hardship in the city.

Its entry on the Harlem Renaissance, Encyclopædia Britannica describes the play as depicting vice and crime with "vernacular and slang-ridden dialogue". It drew praise from white critics and mixed reactions from African American critics, some of whom lamented its focus on the lower echelons of Harlem society. It played for 93 showings and then toured in other cities.
