= True Story (magazine) =

American magazine published by True Renditions, LLC

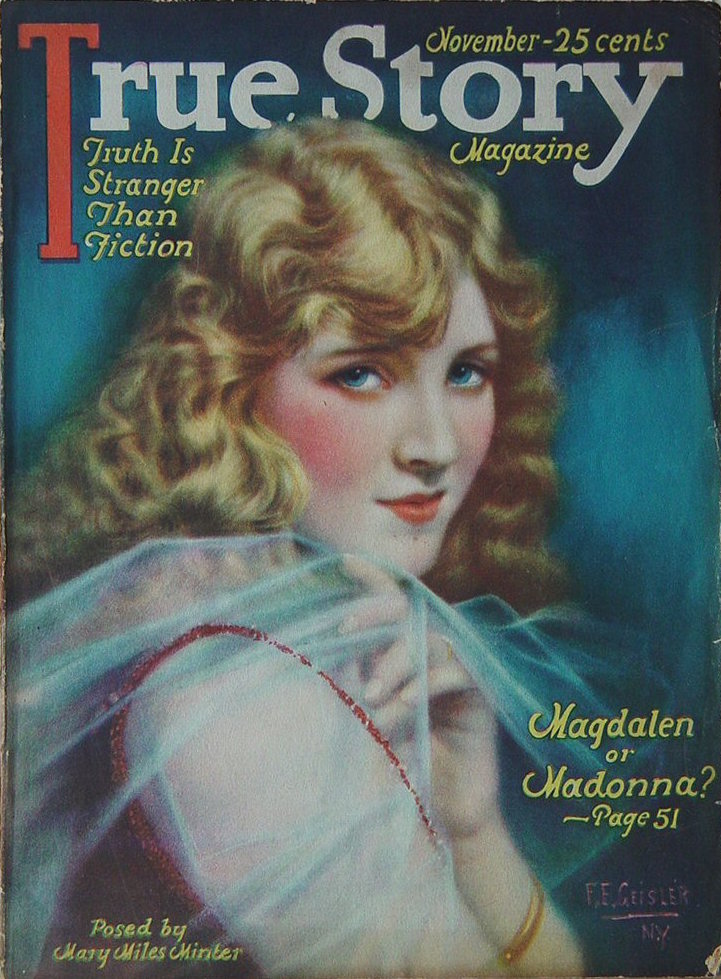
- Actress Mary Miles Minter on True Story (November, 1921). "Magdalen or Madonna?" is deceptive, since page 51 is not about Mary Miles Minter.
- Frequency: Monthly
- Founded: 1919
- Company: True Renditions, LLC
- Country: USA
- Based in: New York City
- Language: English
- Website: www.truerenditionsllc.com
- ISSN: 0195-3117

True Story is an American magazine published by True Renditions, LLC. It launched in 1919 and was the first of the confessions magazines genre. It carried the subtitle "Truth Is Stranger Than Fiction".

== Content ==
With a circulation of 300,000 by 1923, the trend-setting publication remained a huge success through the 1920s and was a key title in Bernarr Macfadden's publishing empire of Physical Culture, True Detective, True Romances, Dream World, True Ghost Stories, Photoplay and the tabloid New York Graphic. It sprang from Physical Culture, stemming from the many letters written to the magazine by women about their experiences. By 1929, the circulation of True Story was nearly two million.

True Story offered anecdotal experiences, and the articles it presented, rewritten by staffers, were purportedly true. However, by the mid-1920s, many stories were professional submissions from fiction writers or were staff-written by Macfadden's stable of writers, including Fulton Oursler and Lyon Mearson. The language was kept relentlessly simple; Macfadden would test language on the elevator operator, and reject whatever he could not understand. Articles were illustrated with photographs of posed models, breaking away from the idealistic illustration common in magazines.

The magazine's approach and its audience were detailed by Jackie Hatton:

Sensing a widespread interest in the changing social/sexual codes of modern America, Macfadden put out a new magazine filled with first-hand accounts of social problems such as pre-marital sex, illegitimacy, adultery, unemployment, social relations, and crime (alongside ever-so slightly risque movie-stills of each story's most dramatic moments---the kiss, the temptation, the horrible realization). The magazine personalized issues that were hotly debated in Jazz Age America (dancing, drinking, partying, petting) and offered a unique working-class perspective on issues that were not necessarily unique to the working class. Sensational, emotional, and controversial, True Story disseminated tales of sex, sin and redemption that seemingly revealed the ubiquity of modern sexual and social "irregularity." Most educated observers hated the magazine, figuring that it depicted the worst aspect of the "revolution in manners and morals" that occurred in the 1920s. But workaday America loved the new confessional magazine.

The formula has been characterized as "sin-suffer-repent": the heroine violates standards of behavior, suffers as a consequence, learns her lesson and resolves to live in light of it, unembittered by her pain.

Advertisers were at first reluctant to buy ads for a magazine aimed at the working class, even as the circulation grew, but by 1928, many major companies placed ads, which copied the style of "short words and shorter sentences" and also imitated the sensational style. "Because I Confessed. . . I found the Way To Happiness" titled an Eagle Brand Condensed Sweetened Milk ad for a cookbook; the title character confessed to a married friend that a man would never propose to her because he wanted a good girl, who could cook, and received the advertised cookbook as a loan, using it to win him. "Some Wives Do It, But I Wouldn't Dare" advertised Wheatena; the narrator would never dare send her husband off without a good breakfast.

== 1930s and 40s ==
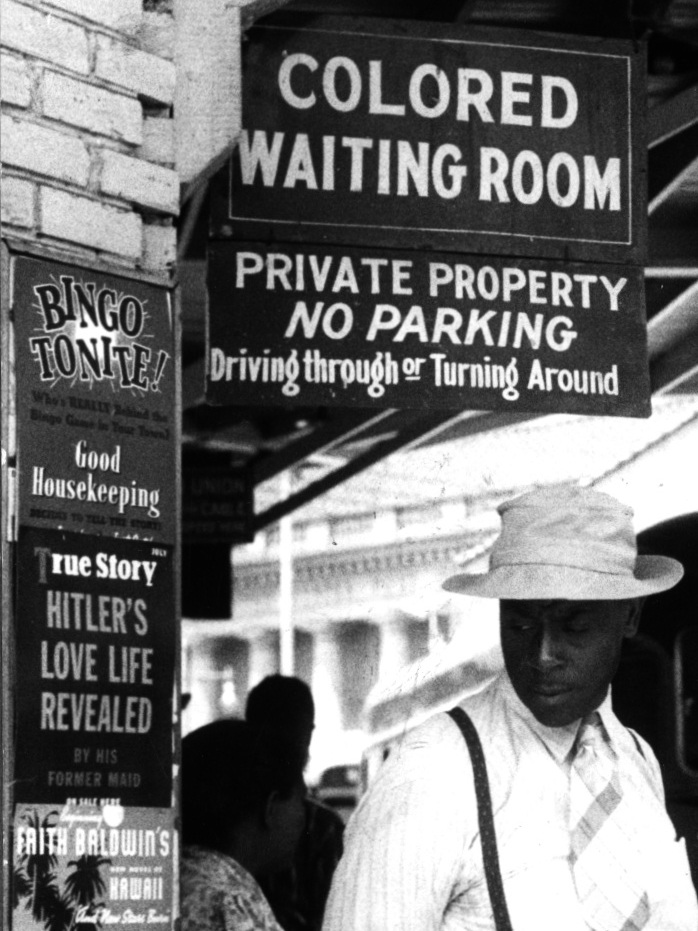
Bottom left: "Hitler's Love Life Revealed," an advertisement for True Story at a bus station in North Carolina, May 1940.

During the Great Depression, the emphasis lay on feminine behavior, maternity, marriage, and stoic endurance, often in the face of horrific suffering. Women who dedicated themselves to work were unable to marry or maintain a happy marriage; women who remained independent could not conceive or suffered miscarriages and stillbirths.

With the outbreak of World War II, the stories began to feature war work favorably. However, it continued the sexual themes, such as having war workers be seduced, have affairs with married men, or engage in many casual affairs; the Magazine Bureau objected to this, as hindering recruitment, and argued that war workers should not be shown as more prone to dalliance than other women, and the magazine removed such themes from stories dealing with war workers. The ambitious career woman still appeared; women, however, who worked from patriotic motives were able to maintain their marriages and bear children. During post-war reconversion, the emphasis changed to marriage and motherhood.

== 1950s editions ==
The cover of the January 1954 issue with Myrna Hansen as Miss True Story

In the 1950s, themes changed again, now employing more stories involving teenage girls reflecting on their "lot in life" and the outcomes of their poor life choices. Many of the "True Story of the Month" featured girls who had married young, and had married wrongly. These tales included hostile in-laws, brutal living conditions and feelings of hopelessness and reached resolution when the person telling the story accepted her situation and promised to accept her position in life for the sake of her family. The magazine spoke out loudly on the issue of abortion (it was against it), birth control (against it because it led to situations in which girls could be taken advantage of) and the duties of raising children with profound developmental issues.

Advice columns, a regular feature, were written by True Story "authority" "Helen Willman." Marital advice, under the title "The Marriage Desk," was given by "Dr. Lena Levine, M.D." The columns glossed over issues of physical abuse toward women by the men that they had chosen as their boyfriends and husbands. The physical abuse was often rationalized as the letter writers' fault for not understanding their boyfriends/husbands' needs. In one notable 1956 response to a "letter from a reader" who asked why her husband beat her when he came home from work, the magazines response from "Helen Willman" advised the writer that she needed to understand that "your husband works hard," and when he returned from work he "doesn't want or need her burdening her husband with her needs," but that she should better serve her husband and keep the children quiet so he can relax. "Try not to complain," wrote Willman.

The 1950s also brought about double page color photographs posed in dramatic fashions, which played to the leading titles given the works.

Goods advertised in True Story in the 1950s were relied heavily on inexpensive beauty treatments (shampoos, toothpaste, creams, feminine hygiene products) and inexpensive kitchen remodeling projects and appliances. The backs of the magazines were heavily filled with "penny ads" for correspondence courses in nursing, dog grooming, hotel management and holiday card sales.

The magazine relied on single and triple column layouts, printed upon folios of inexpensive papers that alternated between heavy newsprint and low weight, low luster paper used for color print sections. Stories often started in the second section of the magazine, usually with dramatic photographs, and then readers had to flip to the rear of the magazine to complete the articles. Articles were tagged as "True Story of the Month", "Award Winning Story" and "Special Double Article" headers. Who or what gave the award to the story was never disclosed.

== Editorial history ==
From 1919 to 1926, John Brennan Willian edited True Story. William Jourdan Rapp was the editor from 1926 to 1942, serving under Editor-in-Chief Henry Lieferant.

Macfadden's consumer division merged with Sterling's Magazines in 1991; Dorchester Media acquired Sterling/Macfadden in 2004. True Renditions, LLC, acquired True Story and additional confession magazines from Dorchester Media on March 9, 2012.

The headquarters of True Story is in New York City.

== Radio ==
True Story was the basis for a radio series, The True Story Court of Human Relations, produced by an advertising agency to promote the magazine. The program was directed by radio historian Erik Barnouw and broadcast live on NBC beginning in 1935 and continuing through the 1930s. Another radio series, My True Story, was based on material from the magazine, as was a television adaptation of the radio series.

== British edition ==
The UK edition of True Story duplicated the American magazine but also added British material. It was first published by Hutchinson's in 1922. The Argus Press became the publisher in 1949.
