= African American comedy =

African American comedy has had a substantial role in American culture from minstrel shows, vaudeville, blackface, and coon songs to some of the world's most popular comedians, shows and filmmakers.

Darryl Littleton and Mel Watkins have written about the subject. Paul Beatty edited Hokum: An Anthology of African-American Humor (2006). So Why We Laugh; Black Comedians in Black Comedy is a documentary film. Dexter G. Gordon wrote about humor in African American discourse.

== History ==
Bob Cole worked on theatrical shows. George Walker was a performer. Ernest Hogan was a performer in shows. Ebony Film Corporation's short comedies drew controversy. Peter P. Jones' film company in Chicago filmed various subjects including vaudeville acts. Will Marion Cook, J. Rosamond Johnson, and James Weldon Johnson were also involved in musical theater.

== Television shows ==
- Amos 'n' Andy
- The Beulah Show
- Good Times
- Sanford and Son
- What's Happening!!
- The Jeffersons
- Def Comedy Jam
- In Living Color
- The Steve Harvey Show
- Kenan & Kel
- The Fresh Prince of Bel-Air
- The Boondocks

== Comedians ==
- Bert Williams
- Stepin Fetchit
- Moms Mabley
- Spencer Williams Jr.
- Flip Wilson
- Mantan Moreland
- Redd Foxx
- Eddie Murphy
- Richard Pryor
- Bill Cosby
- Jimmie Walker
- Dick Gregory
- LaWanda Page
- Arsenio Hall
- Paul Mooney
- Leslie Jones
- Dave Chappelle
- Kevin Hart
- Chris Rock
- Chris Tucker
- Steve Harvey
- Wanda Sykes
- Rickey Smiley
- D. L. Hughley
- Tracy Morgan
- Whoopi Goldberg
- Bernie Mac
- Cedric the Entertainer

== Filmmakers ==
- Spike Lee
- Tyler Perry

== See also ==
- African-American musical theater
- Ragtime
- African American cinema
- Ethnic humor
- Ethnic stereotypes
