= Lulu Belle (film) =

1948 film by Leslie Fenton

- Theatrical release poster
- Directed by: Leslie Fenton
- Written by: Karl Kamb (additional dialogue)
- Screenplay by: Everett Freeman
- Based on: Lulu Belle by Charles MacArthur and Edward Sheldon
- Produced by: Benedict Bogeaus
- Starring: Dorothy Lamour; George Montgomery
- Cinematography: Ernest Laszlo
- Edited by: James Smith
- Music by: Henry Russell
- Production company: Benedict Bogeaus Production
- Distributed by: Columbia Pictures
- Release date: August 15, 1948
- Running time: 87 minutes
- Country: United States
- Language: English

Lulu Belle is a 1948 American drama musical romance film directed by Leslie Fenton and starring Dorothy Lamour. The film was a loose and highly sanitized adaptation of Charles MacArthur and Edward Sheldon's hit 1926 Broadway play of the same name. The play was a critique of American middle class morality and inter-racial relationships and told the story of Lulu Belle, a black cabaret performer and prostitute in Harlem, who becomes the object of desire for first a white married barber and later a white boxer.

The play's theme of miscegenation and its authentic depiction of black life and community in 1920s Harlem was completely removed from the film; which was uncomfortable with the play's openness about both sex and race. The resulting film was a convoluted and heavily Code-censored film version of the play. Lulu Belle was transformed from a black prostitute from Harlem into a white blues singer from Mississippi who could not be true to her boxer beau. The film also transformed the play into a musical as the original stage work contained little music. The film also re-wrote the ending. In the play Lulu is murdered and no characters are left in a positive situation. In the film Lulu is only injured and the work ends on a bitter-sweet note. Although the film offered a change of pace for its star, Dorothy Lamour, it was not a success at the box office.

== Plot ==
Famous Broadway singer Lulu Belle and Harry Randolph, her rich suitor, are found shot and severely wounded in her dressing room one night after the show. They are discovered by Lulu's best friend, Molly Benson, and taken unconscious to the hospital.

Lulu's ex-husband, George Davis, is accused of the shooting, since he has been previously convicted of attempted murder of another man who got too close to Lulu. During George's interrogation he tells the story of how he met Lulu for the first time. She was performing in a dodgy place called the Natchez Café, and he was so taken with her that he left his fiancée and law practice to elope with her to New Orleans. They lived a wild life of luxury for a while until his money ran out. She left for another man, high-stakes gambler Mark Brady to support her expensive lifestyle. George realizes that Lulu is bad news and leaves her. It doesn't take long before they get back together again. Lulu is offered a job by Mark, as a singer at a club he is starting, and George starts drinking heavily to drown his sorrows. He tries to get Molly to help stop Lulu's way of life. Lulu wants to divorce him to set him free. That night a wealthy man named Harry Randolph comes to visit the club with his wife. He is immediately smitten with Lulu, and decides to help her become a star on Broadway.

George picks a fight with boxer Butch and is beaten black and blue. George manages to stick a fork in Butch's eye and put an end to his fighting career. For this he is convicted and sentenced to prison. Lulu goes with Randolph, her new benefactor, to New York and Broadway. Randolph puts a lot of money and effort into building Lulu's career and a theater. After five years of working close together, Randolph asks Lulu to marry him. Lulu finds out that George has been released from prison and asks him to come her apartment. Mark turns up later in the evening at the theater and tries to force Lulu to come back with him, but she refuses. George meets Lulu right after the show that night and is sucked into her beam of charm again, when she proclaims her love for him. They decide to start a new life together. Without hesitation, Lulu tells Randolph that she won't marry him and he is upset. Then comes the night of the shooting.

Returning to the present, police commissioner Dixon gathers all the persons involved in the story, including Mrs. Randolph, at the dying Randolph's bedside. He asks Randolph to tell them who the shooter was, and he reveals it was his wife. George is vindicated and freed of all charges. He stays by Lulu's side long enough to make sure she will recover, then returns to his hometown alone.

== Cast ==
- Dorothy Lamour as Lulu Belle
- George Montgomery as George Davis
- Albert Dekker as Mark Brady
- Otto Kruger as Harry Randolph
- Glenda Farrell as Molly Benson
- Greg McClure as Butch Cooper
- Charlotte Wynters as Mrs. Randolph
