= Development of musical theatre =

Overview of early centuries of Western musical theatre

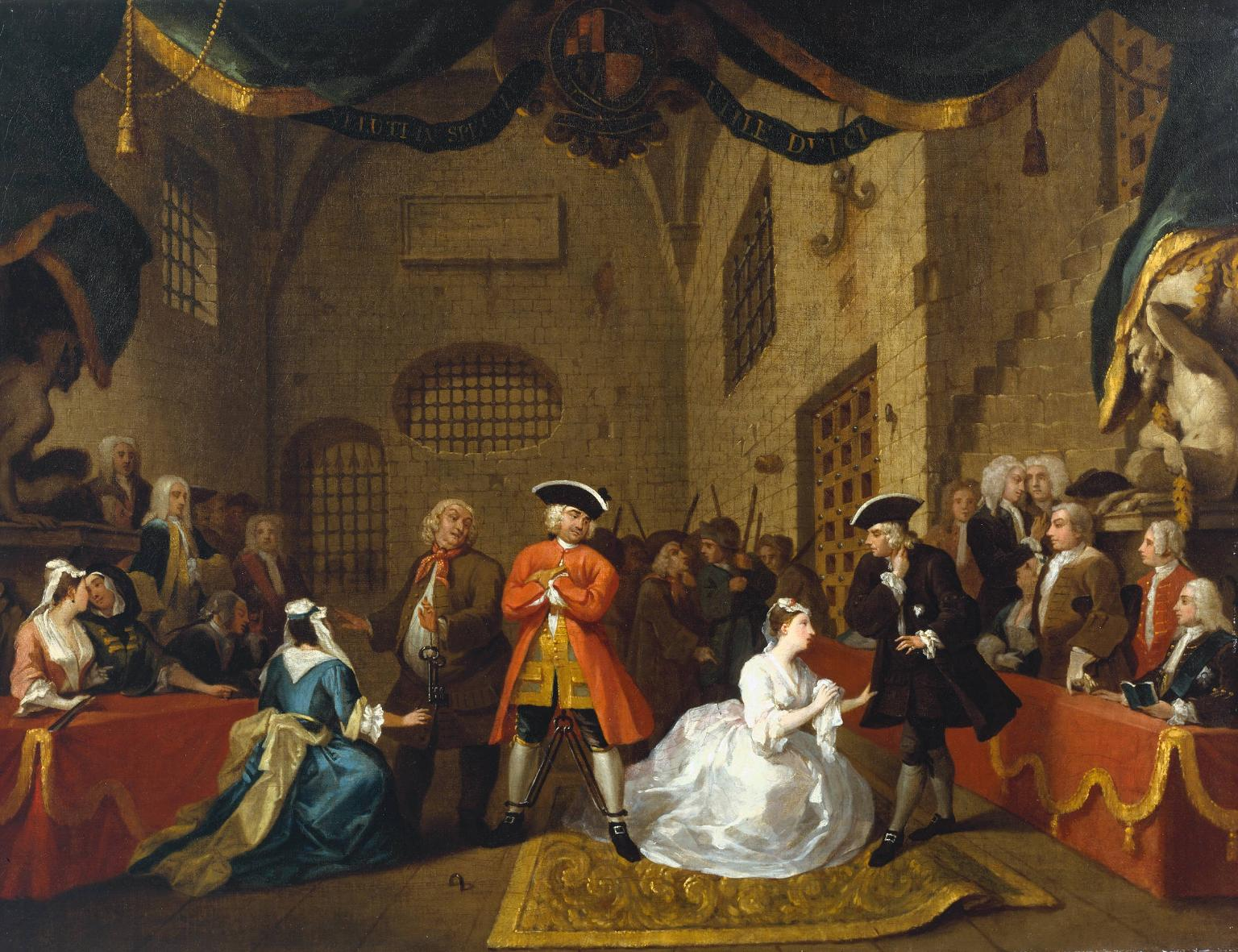
A William Hogarth painting based on The Beggar's Opera (c. 1728), a key antecedent of musical theatre

Development of musical theatre refers to the historical development of theatrical performance combined with music that culminated in the integrated form of modern musical theatre that combines songs, spoken dialogue, acting and dance. Although music has been a part of dramatic presentations since ancient times, modern Western musical theatre developed from several lines of antecedents that evolved over several centuries through the 18th century when the Ballad Opera and pantomime emerged in England and its colonies as the most popular forms of musical entertainment.

In the 19th century, following the development of European operetta, many of the structural elements of modern musical theatre were established by the works of Gilbert and Sullivan in Britain and those of Harrigan and Hart in America. These were followed by the Edwardian musical comedies, beginning in the 1890s in England, and the musical theatre works of American creators like George M. Cohan early in the 20th century. The Princess Theatre musicals in New York City during the First World War, and other smart shows like Of Thee I Sing (1931) were artistic steps forward beyond revues and other frothy entertainments of the early 20th century and led to the modern "book" musical, where songs and dances are fully integrated into a well-made story with serious dramatic goals that is able to evoke genuine emotions other than laughter.

== Early antecedents: antiquity to Middle Ages ==
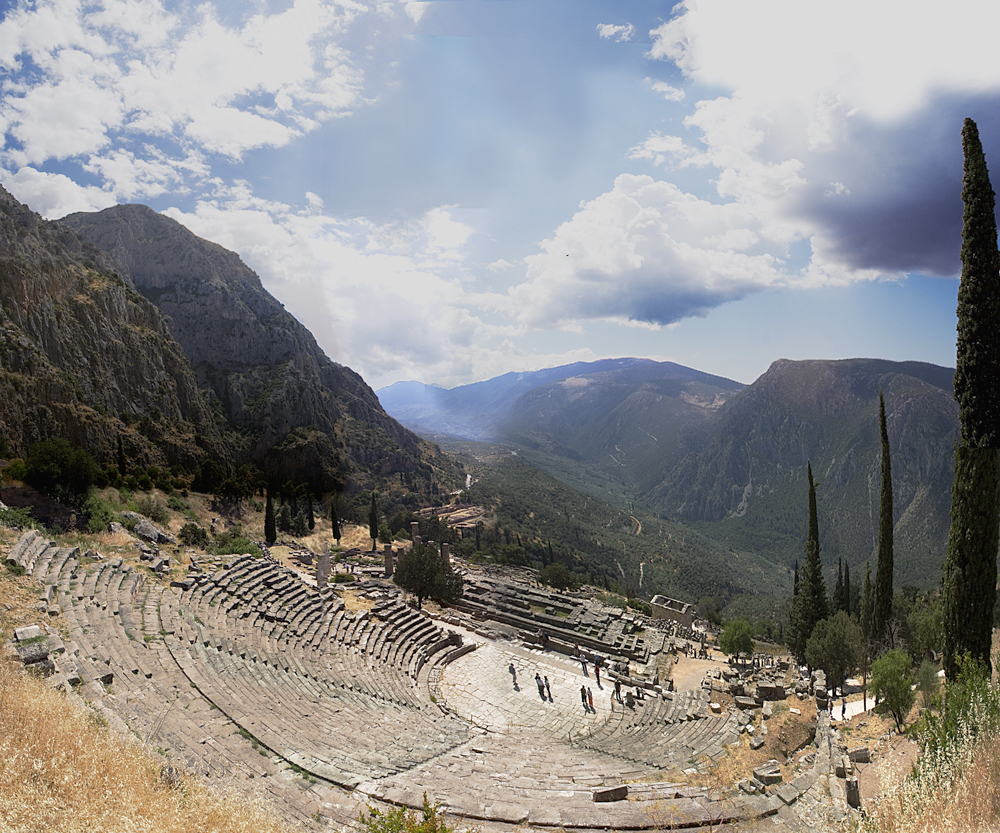
The Ancient Theatre of Delphi.

The antecedents of musical theatre in Europe can be traced back to the theatre of ancient Greece, where music and dance were included in stage comedies and tragedies during the 5th century BCE. The dramatists Aeschylus and Sophocles composed their own music to accompany their plays and choreographed the dances of the chorus. The 3rd-century BCE Roman comedies of Plautus included song and dance routines performed with orchestrations. The Romans also introduced technical innovations. For example, to make dance steps more audible in large open-air theatres, Roman actors attached metal chips called sabilla to their stage footwear, creating the first tap shoes. The music from all of these forms is lost, however, and they had little influence on later development of musical theatre.

By the Middle Ages, theatre in Europe consisted mostly of travelling minstrels and small performing troupes of performers singing and offering slapstick comedy. In the 12th and 13th centuries, religious dramas, such as The Play of Herod and The Play of Daniel taught the liturgy, set to church chants. Later "mystery plays" were created that told a biblical story in a sequence of entertaining parts. Several pageant wagons (stages on wheels) would move about the city, and a group of actors would tell their part of the story. Once finished, the group would move on with their wagon, and the next group would arrive to tell its part of the story. These plays developed into an autonomous form of musical theatre, with poetic forms sometimes alternating with the prose dialogues and liturgical chants. The poetry was provided with modified or completely new melodies.

== Renaissance to the 1800s ==
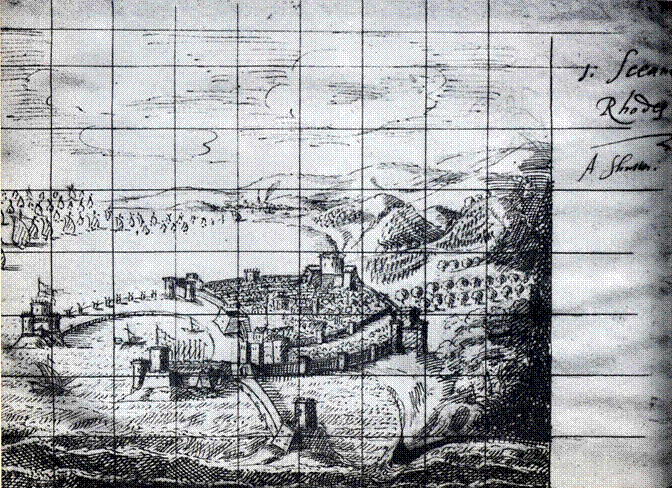
A view of Rhodes by John Webb, to be painted on a backshutter for the first performance of The Siege of Rhodes (1856)

The European Renaissance saw older forms evolve into commedia dell'arte, an Italian tradition where raucous clowns improvised their way through familiar stories, and later, opera buffa. In England, Elizabethan and Jacobean plays frequently included music, with performances on organs, lutes, viols and pipes for up to an hour before and during the performance. Plays, perhaps particularly the heavier histories and tragedies, were frequently broken up with a short musical play, perhaps derived from the Italian intermezzo, with music, jokes and dancing, or were followed by an afterpiece known as a jigg, often consisting of scandalous or libellous dialogue set to popular tunes (anticipating the Ballad Opera). Court masques also developed during the Tudor period that involved music, dancing, singing and acting, often with expensive costumes and a complex stage design, sometimes by a renowned architect such as Inigo Jones, presented a deferential allegory flattering to a noble or royal patron. Ben Jonson wrote many masques, often collaborating with Jones. William Shakespeare often included masque-like sections in his plays.

The musical sections of masques developed into sung plays that are recognizable as English operas, the first usually being thought of as William Davenant's The Siege of Rhodes (1656), originally given in a private performance. In France, meanwhile, Molière turned several of his farcical comedies into musical entertainments with songs (music provided by Jean Baptiste Lully) and dance in the late 17th century. His Psyche was the model for an English opera by Thomas Shadwell, The Miser produced in 1672. Davenant produced The Tempest in 1667, which was the first Shakespeare plot set to music, and was then adapted by Shadwell into an opera in 1674 (composed by Matthew Locke and others). About 1683, John Blow composed Venus and Adonis, often considered the first true English-language opera. Blow was followed by Henry Purcell and a brief period of English opera. After the death of Charles II in 1685, English opera began to fall out of fashion.

By the 18th century, the most popular forms of musical theatre in Britain were ballad operas, like John Gay's The Beggar's Opera (1728), that included lyrics written to the tunes of popular songs of the day (often spoofing opera), and later the developing form of pantomime and comic operas with original scores and mostly romantic plot lines, like Michael Balfe's The Bohemian Girl (1845). Meanwhile, on the continent, singspiel, comédie en vaudeville, opéra comique and other forms of light musical entertainment were emerging. Other musical theatre forms developed by the 19th century, such as music hall and melodrama. Melodramas and burlettas, in particular, were popularized partly because most London theatres were licensed only as music halls and not allowed to present plays without music. Some unlicensed theaters avoided the legal restrictions by providing supposedly free musical shows while serving tea at wildly inflated prices. In 1820, a new ordinance restricted all unlicensed theater productions to no more than six songs, which had to be an organic part of the play rather than a break or digression. In any event, what a piece was called did not necessarily define what it was. The Broadway extravaganza The Magic Deer (1852) advertised itself as "A Serio Comico Tragico Operatical Historical Extravaganzical Burletical Tale of Enchantment."

The first recorded long-running play of any kind was The Beggar's Opera, which ran for 62 successive performances in 1728. It would take almost a century before the first play broke 100 performances, with Tom and Jerry, based on the book Life in London (1821), and the record soon reached 150 in the late 1820s. Colonial America did not have a significant theatre presence until 1752, when London entrepreneur William Hallam sent a company of twelve actors to the colonies with his brother Lewis as their manager. They established a theatre in Williamsburg, Virginia and opened with The Merchant of Venice and The Anatomist. The company moved to New York in the summer of 1753, performing ballad-operas such as The Beggar’s Opera and ballad-farces like Damon and Phillida. By the 1840s, P.T. Barnum was operating an entertainment complex in lower Manhattan. Other early musical theatre in America consisted of British forms, such as burletta and pantomime. Theatre in New York moved from downtown gradually to midtown from around 1850, seeking less expensive real estate prices, and did not arrive in the Times Square area until the 1920s and 1930s. Broadway's first "long-run" musical was a 50 performance hit called The Elves in 1857. New York runs continued to lag far behind those in London, but Laura Keene's "musical burletta" Seven Sisters (1860) shattered previous New York records with a run of 253 performances.

== 1850s to 1880s ==
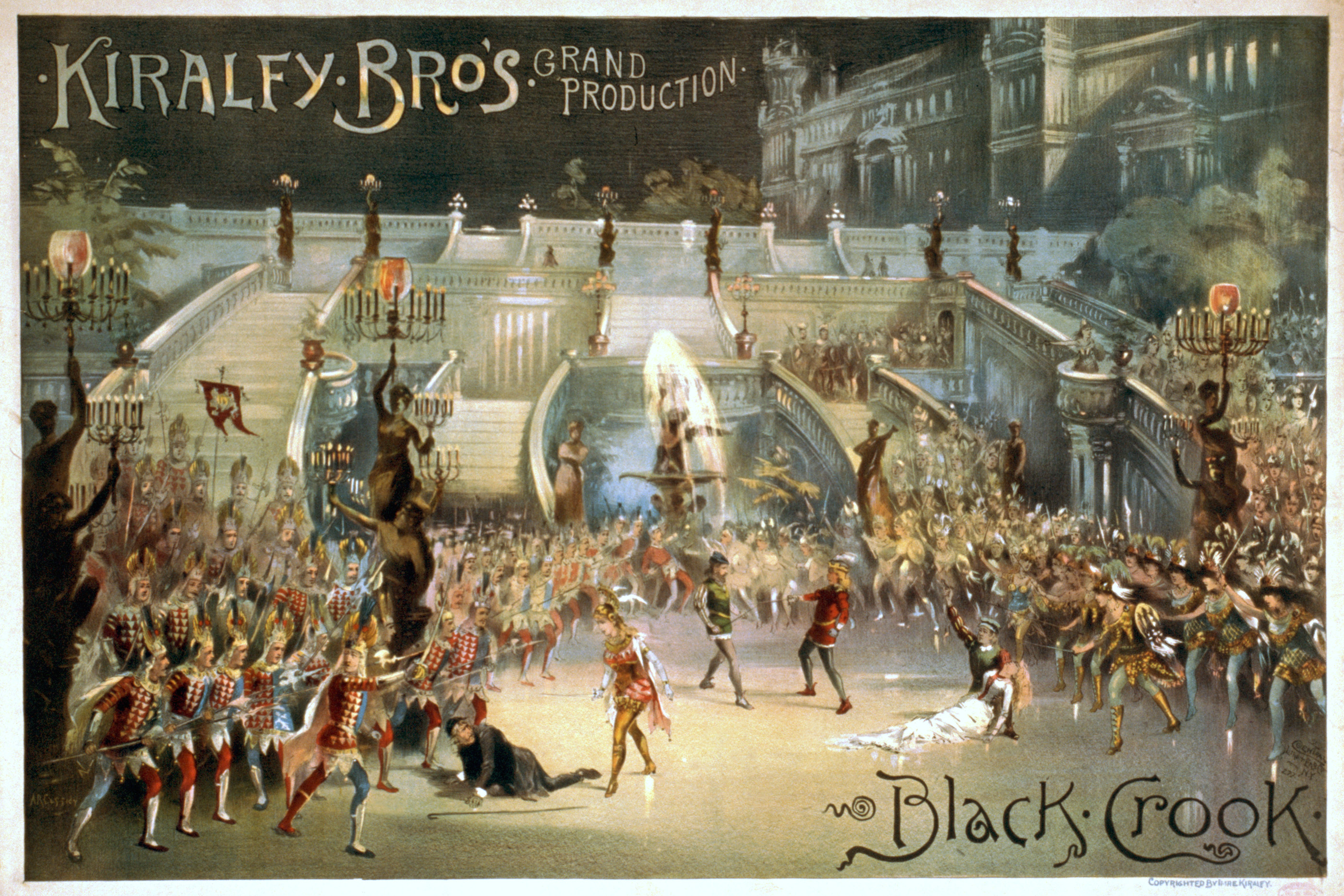
The Black Crook (1866), which some historians consider the first modern musical

Around 1850, the French composer Hervé was experimenting with a form of comic musical theatre that came to be called opérette. The best known composers of operetta were Jacques Offenbach from the 1850s to the 1870s and Johann Strauss II in the 1870s and 1880s. Offenbach's fertile melodies, combined with his librettists' witty satire, formed a model for the musical theatre that followed. In 1957, Mark Lubbock traced the development of musical theatre from Offenbach to Gilbert and Sullivan and eventually to Irving Berlin and Rodgers and Hammerstein, writing: "Offenbach is undoubtedly the most significant figure in the history of the 'musical'. In the mid-19th century in England, musical theatre consisted of mostly of music hall, adaptations of the French operettas (played in bad, risqué translations) and musical burlesques (the culmination of which were seen at the Gaiety Theatre beginning in 1868). In reaction to these, a few family-friendly entertainments were created, such as the German Reed Entertainments.

In America, mid-19th century musical theatre entertainments included crude variety revue, which eventually developed into vaudeville, minstrel shows, which soon crossed the Atlantic to Britain, and Victorian burlesque, first popularized in the US by British troupes. Kurt Gänzl considers The Doctor of Alcantara (1862), with music composed by Julius Eichberg and a book and lyrics by Benjamin E Woolf, to be the "first American musical", though he also points to even earlier works. A hugely successful musical entertainment that premiered in New York in 1866, The Black Crook, combined dance and some original music that helped to tell the story. The spectacular production, famous for its skimpy costumes, ran for a record-breaking 474 performances. The same year, The Black Domino/Between You, Me and the Post was the first show to call itself a "musical comedy". In 1874, Evangeline or The Belle of Arcadia, by Edward E. Rice and J. Cheever Goodwin, based loosely on Longfellow’s Evangeline, with an original American story and music, opened successfully in New York and was revived in Boston, New York, and in repeated tours. Comedians Edward Harrigan and Tony Hart produced and starred in musicals on Broadway between 1878 (The Mulligan Guard Picnic) and 1885. These musical comedies featured characters and situations taken from the everyday life of New York's lower classes. They starred high quality singers (Lillian Russell, Vivienne Segal and Fay Templeton) instead of the ladies of questionable repute who had starred in earlier musical forms. In 1879, The Brook by Nate Salsbury was another national success with contemporary American dance styles and an American story about "members of an acting company taking a trip down a river ... with lots of obstacles and mishaps along the way".

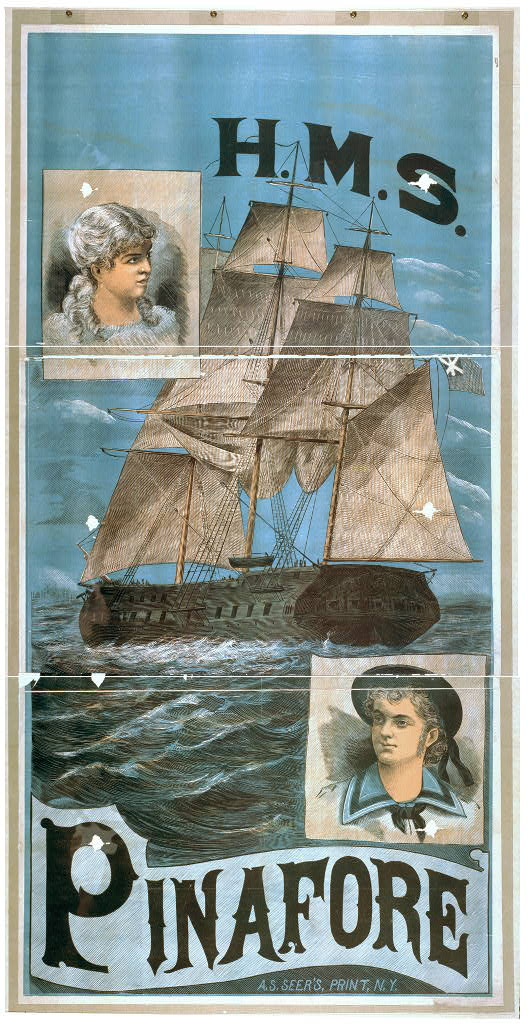
Poster, c. 1879

The length of runs in the theatre changed rapidly around the same time that the modern musical emerged. As transportation improved, poverty in London and New York diminished, and street lighting made for safer travel at night, the number of potential patrons for the growing number of theatres increased enormously. Plays could run longer and still draw in the audiences, leading to better profits and improved production values. The first play to achieve 500 consecutive performances was the London (non-musical) comedy Our Boys, opening in 1875, which set an astonishing new record of 1,362 performances. This run was not equaled on the musical stage until World War I, but musical theatre soon broke the 500 performance mark in London, most notably by the series of more than a dozen long-running Gilbert and Sullivan family-friendly comic opera hits, including H.M.S. Pinafore in 1878 and The Mikado in 1885. These were sensations on both sides of the Atlantic and, along with the other changes in the theatre, raised the standard for what was considered a successful run. Only a few 19th century musical pieces exceeded the run of the Mikado: The Chimes of Normandy (Les Cloches de Corneville) ran for 705 performances in 1878 in London, and Alfred Cellier and B. C. Stephenson's 1886 hit, Dorothy (a show midway between comic opera and musical comedy), set a new record with 931 performances.

Gilbert and Sullivan's influence on later musical theatre was profound, creating examples of how to "integrate" musicals so that the lyrics and dialogue were designed to advance a coherent story. Their works were admired and copied by early authors and composers of musicals such as Ivan Caryll, Lionel Monckton, P. G. Wodehouse, and Victor Herbert, and later Jerome Kern, Ira Gershwin, Lorenz Hart, Alan Jay Lerner, Yip Harburg, Irving Berlin, Ivor Novello, Oscar Hammerstein II and Andrew Lloyd Webber. Other British composers of the 1870s and 1880s included Edward Solomon and F. Osmond Carr. The most popular British shows, beginning with the Savoy operas, also enjoyed profitable New York productions and tours of Britain, America, Europe, Australasia and South Africa. These shows were fare for "respectable" audiences, a marked contrast from the risqué burlesques, melodramas, minstrel shows, bawdy music hall shows and French operettas that dominated the stage prior to Gilbert and Sullivan and drew a sometimes seedy crowd looking for less wholesome entertainment.

== 1890s to the new century ==
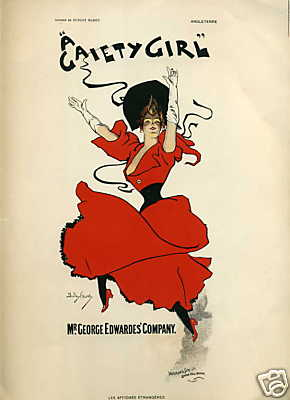
A Gaiety Girl (1893) was one of the first hit musicals

Charles H. Hoyt's A Trip to Chinatown (1891) was Broadway's long-run champion (until Irene in 1919), running for 657 performances. Gilbert and Sullivan's comic operas were both pirated and imitated in New York by productions such as Reginald de Koven's Robin Hood (1891) and John Philip Sousa's El Capitan (1896). A Trip to Coontown (1898) was the first musical comedy entirely produced and performed by African Americans in a Broadway theatre (largely inspired by the routines of the minstrel shows), followed by the ragtime-tinged Clorindy, or the Origin of the Cakewalk (1898), and the highly successful In Dahomey (1902). Hundreds of musical comedies were staged on Broadway in the 1890s and early 20th century composed of songs written in New York's Tin Pan Alley by composers such as Gus Edwards, John Walter Bratton and George M. Cohan (Little Johnny Jones (1904)). Still, New York runs continued to be relatively short, with a few exceptions, compared with London runs, until the 1920s. Tours, however, were often extensive, beginning with the original Broadway cast.

Meanwhile, musicals had spread to the London stage by the Gay Nineties. George Edwardes had left the management of Richard D'Oyly Carte's Savoy Theatre. He took over the Gaiety Theatre and, at first, he improved the quality of the old burlesques. He perceived that audiences wanted a new alternative to the Savoy-style comic operas and their intellectual, political, absurdist satire. He experimented with a modern-dress, family-friendly musical theatre style, with breezy, popular songs, snappy, romantic banter, and stylish spectacle at the Gaiety, Daly's Theatre and other venues. These drew on the traditions of comic opera and also used elements of burlesque and of the Harrigan and Hart pieces. He replaced the bawdy women of burlesque with his "respectable" corps of dancing, singing Gaiety Girls to complete the musical and visual fun. The success of the first of these, In Town in 1892 and A Gaiety Girl in 1893, confirmed Edwardes on the path he was taking. These "musical comedies", as he called them, revolutionized the London stage and set the tone for the next three decades.

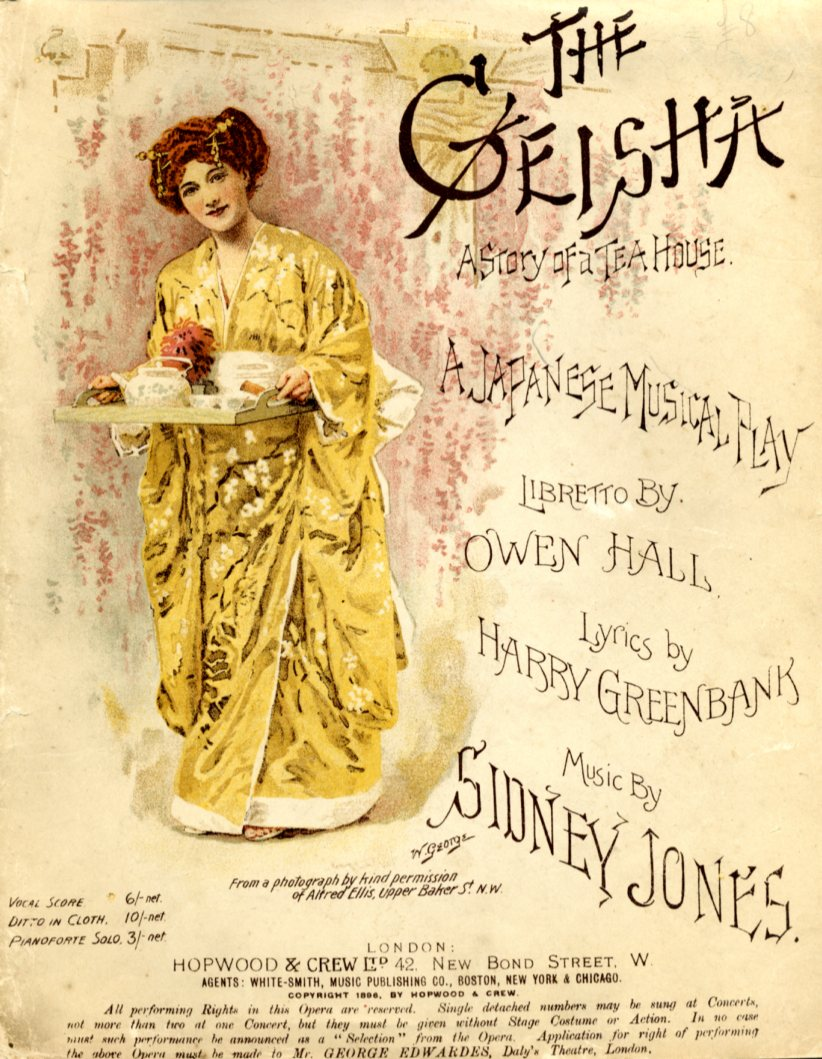
Cover of the Vocal Score of Sidney Jones' The Geisha

Edwardes' early Gaiety hits included a series of light, romantic "poor maiden loves aristocrat and wins him against all odds" shows, usually with the word "Girl" in the title, including The Shop Girl (1894) and A Runaway Girl (1898), with music by Ivan Caryll and Lionel Monckton. These shows were immediately widely copied at other London theatres (and soon in America), and the Edwardian musical comedy swept away the earlier musical forms of comic opera and operetta. At Daly's Theatre, Edwardes presented slightly more complex comedy hits. The Geisha (1896) by Sidney Jones with lyrics by Harry Greenbank and Adrian Ross and then Jones' San Toy (1899) each ran for more than two years and also found great international success, for example in Australian productions by J. C. Williamson.

The British musical comedy Florodora (1899) by Leslie Stuart and Paul Rubens made a splash on both sides of the Atlantic, as did A Chinese Honeymoon (1901), by British lyricist George Dance and American-born composer Howard Talbot, which ran for a record setting 1,074 performances in London and 376 in New York. The story concerns couples who honeymoon in China and inadvertently break the kissing laws (shades of The Mikado). The Belle of New York (1898) ran for 697 performances in London after a brief New York run, becoming the first American musical to run for over a year in London. After the turn of the 20th century, Seymour Hicks (who joined forces with American producer Charles Frohman) wrote popular shows with composer Charles Taylor and others, and Edwardes and Ross continued to churn out hits like The Toreador (1901), A Country Girl (1902), The Orchid (1903), The Girls of Gottenberg (1907) and Our Miss Gibbs (1909). Other Edwardian musical comedy hits included The Arcadians (1909) and The Quaker Girl (1910).

== Operetta and World War I ==
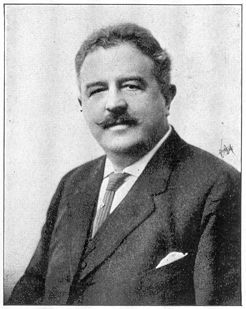
Victor Herbert

Virtually eliminated from the English-speaking stage by competition from the ubiquitous Edwardian musical comedies in the 1890s, operettas returned to London and Broadway in 1907 with The Merry Widow, and operettas and musicals became direct competitors for a time. In the early years of the 20th century, English-language adaptations of 19th century continental operettas, as well as operettas by a new generation of European composers, such as Franz Lehár and Oscar Straus, among others, spread throughout the English-speaking world. In America, Victor Herbert produced a string of famous operettas (The Fortune Teller (1898), Babes in Toyland (1903), Mlle. Modiste (1905), The Red Mill (1906) and Naughty Marietta (1910)), often with librettist Harry B. Smith, as well as some intimate musical plays with modern settings. In English-speaking countries, during World War I, German-language operetta lost its popularity.

Among other British and American composers and librettists of the 1910s, the team of P. G. Wodehouse, Guy Bolton and Jerome Kern stood out. Following in the footsteps of Gilbert and Sullivan, their "Princess Theatre shows" paved the way for Kern's later work by showing that a musical could combine light, popular entertainment with continuity between its story and songs:

"These shows built and polished the mold from which almost all later major musical comedies evolved. ... The characters and situations were, within the limitations of musical comedy license, believable and the humor came from the situations or the nature of the characters. Kern's exquisitely flowing melodies were employed to further the action or develop characterization. The integration of song and story is periodically announced as a breakthrough in ... musical theater. Great opera has always done this, and it is easy to demonstrate such integration in Gilbert and Sullivan or the French opera bouffe. However, early musical comedy was often guilty of inserting songs in a hit-or-miss fashion. The Princess Theatre musicals brought about a change in approach. P. G. Wodehouse, the most observant, literate, and witty lyricist of his day, and the team of Bolton, Wodehouse, and Kern had an influence felt to this day.

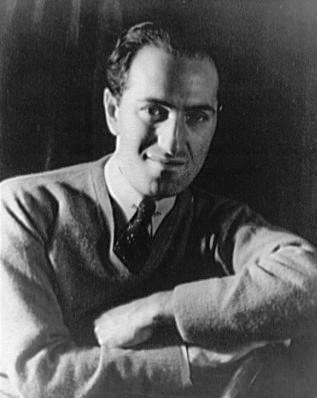
George Gershwin

The theatre-going public needed escapist entertainment during the dark times of World War I, and they flocked to the theatre. Harry Tierney and Joseph McCarthy's 1919 hit musical Irene ran for 670 performances, a Broadway record that held until 1938's Hellzapoppin. The British public supported far longer runs like that of Maid of the Mountains (1,352 performances) and especially Chu Chin Chow. Its run of 2,238 performances was more than twice as many as any previous musical, setting a record that stood for nearly forty years until Salad Days. Revues like The Bing Boys Are Here in Britain, and those of Florenz Ziegfeld and his imitators in America, were also extraordinarily popular. A new generation of composers of operettas emerged in the 1920s, such as Rudolf Friml and Sigmund Romberg.

The primacy of British musical theatre from the 19th century through 1920 was gradually replaced by American innovation in the 20th century. Edwardes' competitor and counterpart in the U.S. was Charles Frohman and his Theatrical Syndicate. George M. Cohan's and Herbert's musical entertainments after the turn of the century gave way to the Princess Theatre shows and a profusion of other musicals as Kern and other Tin Pan Alley composers began to bring new musical styles such as ragtime and jazz to the theatres. The Shubert Brothers took control of the Broadway theatres after the war as new writers like the Gershwin brothers (George and Ira), Irving Berlin and Rodgers and Hart began to produce shows. Musical theatre writer Andrew Lamb notes, "The triumph of American works over European in the first decades of the twentieth century came about against a changing social background. The operatic and theatrical styles of nineteenth-century social structures were replaced by a musical style more aptly suited to twentieth-century society and its vernacular idiom. It was from America that the more direct style emerged, and in America that it was able to flourish in a developing society less hidebound by nineteenth-century tradition."

== The Roaring Twenties and the Great Depression ==
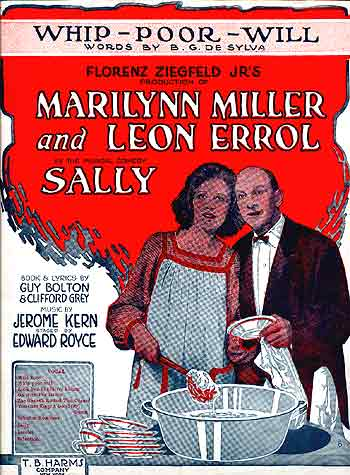
Sheet music from Sally, 1920

The musicals of the Roaring Twenties, borrowing from vaudeville, music hall and other light entertainments, tended to emphasize star actors and actresses, big dance routines, and popular songs, at the expense of plot. Typical of the decade were lighthearted productions like Sally; Lady Be Good; Sunny; No, No, Nanette; Oh, Kay! and Funny Face. While the books of these shows may have been forgettable, they featured stars such as Marilyn Miller and Fred Astaire and produced dozens of enduring popular songs ("standards") by, most notably, Jerome Kern, the Gershwin brothers, Irving Berlin, Cole Porter, Vincent Youmans, and the team of Richard Rodgers and Lorenz Hart. Throughout the first half of the 20th century, popular music was dominated by musical theatre composers and lyricists. These musicals and the standards they produced, including "Fascinating Rhythm", "Tea for Two" and "Someone to Watch Over Me", became popular on both sides of the Atlantic ocean.

Many shows were revues, series of sketches and songs with little or no connection between them. The best-known of these were the annual Ziegfeld Follies, spectacular song-and-dance revues on Broadway featuring extravagant sets, elaborate costumes, and beautiful chorus girls. These spectacles also raised production values, and mounting a musical generally became more expensive. Shuffle Along, an all-African American show was a hit on Broadway. In London, stars such as Ivor Novello and Noël Coward became popular. Meanwhile, operettas, which had been nearly absent from the English-speaking stage since World War I, had a last burst of popularity; works by continental European composers were successful, as were those by Sigmund Romberg and Rudolf Friml in America, which included Rose-Marie and The Student Prince respectively. The last hit operetta of the era on Broadway was Romberg's The New Moon in 1928.

Progressing far beyond the comparatively frivolous musicals and sentimental operettas of the decade, Show Boat, which premiered on December 27, 1927, at the Ziegfeld Theatre in New York, represented an even more complete integration of book and score than the Princess Theatre musicals, with dramatic themes told through the music, dialogue, setting and movement. This was accomplished by combining the lyricism of Kern's music with the skillful craft of Oscar Hammerstein II, who adapted Edna Ferber's novel and wrote lyrics for the show. One historian wrote, "Here we come to a completely new genre – the musical play as distinguished from musical comedy. Now ... the play was the thing, and everything else was subservient to that play. Now ... came complete integration of song, humor and production numbers into a single and inextricable artistic entity." However, Bordman argues, "Show Boat is certainly an operetta with its many arioso passages, its musical depth and seriousness, and its romantic story set, in typical operetta fashion, in the long ago and far away." Nevertheless, as the Great Depression set in during the post-Broadway national tour of Show Boat, the public turned back to light, brassy, escapist entertainment, and no follow-up was produced so seriously treating serious social themes until Oklahoma! in 1943.

The motion picture mounted a challenge to the stage. At first, films were silent and presented only limited competition to theatre. But by the end of the 1920s, films like The Jazz Singer could be presented with synchronized sound. "Talkie" films at low prices effectively killed off vaudeville by the early 1930s. Historian John Kenrick commented: "Top vaudeville stars filmed their acts for one-time pay-offs, inadvertently helping to speed the death of vaudeville. After all, when 'small time' theatres could offer 'big time' performers on screen at a nickel a seat, who could ask audiences to pay higher amounts for less impressive live talent?"

== 1930s to Oklahoma! ==
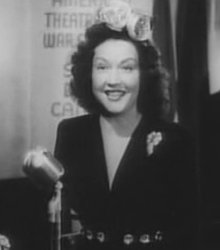
Ethel Merman

The Great Depression affected theatre audiences on both sides of the Atlantic, as people had little money to spend on entertainment. Only a few stage shows exceeded a run on Broadway or in London of 500 performances during the decade.

Many shows continued the lighthearted song-and-dance style of their 1920s predecessors. The revue The Band Wagon (1931) starred dancing partners Fred Astaire and his sister Adele, while Cole Porter's Anything Goes (1934) confirmed Ethel Merman's position as the First Lady of musical theatre, a title she maintained for many years. British writers such as Noël Coward and Ivor Novello continued to deliver old fashioned, sentimental musicals, such as The Dancing Years. Similarly, Rodgers & Hart returned from Hollywood to churn out a series of Broadway hits, including On Your Toes (1936, with Ray Bolger, the first Broadway musical to make dramatic use of classical dance), Babes in Arms (1937), and The Boys from Syracuse (1938), and Cole Porter wrote a similar string of hits, including Anything Goes (1934) and DuBarry Was a Lady (1939). The longest-running piece of musical theatre of the 1930s was Hellzapoppin (1938), a revue with audience participation, which played for 1,404 performances, setting a new Broadway record that was finally beaten by Oklahoma! five years later.

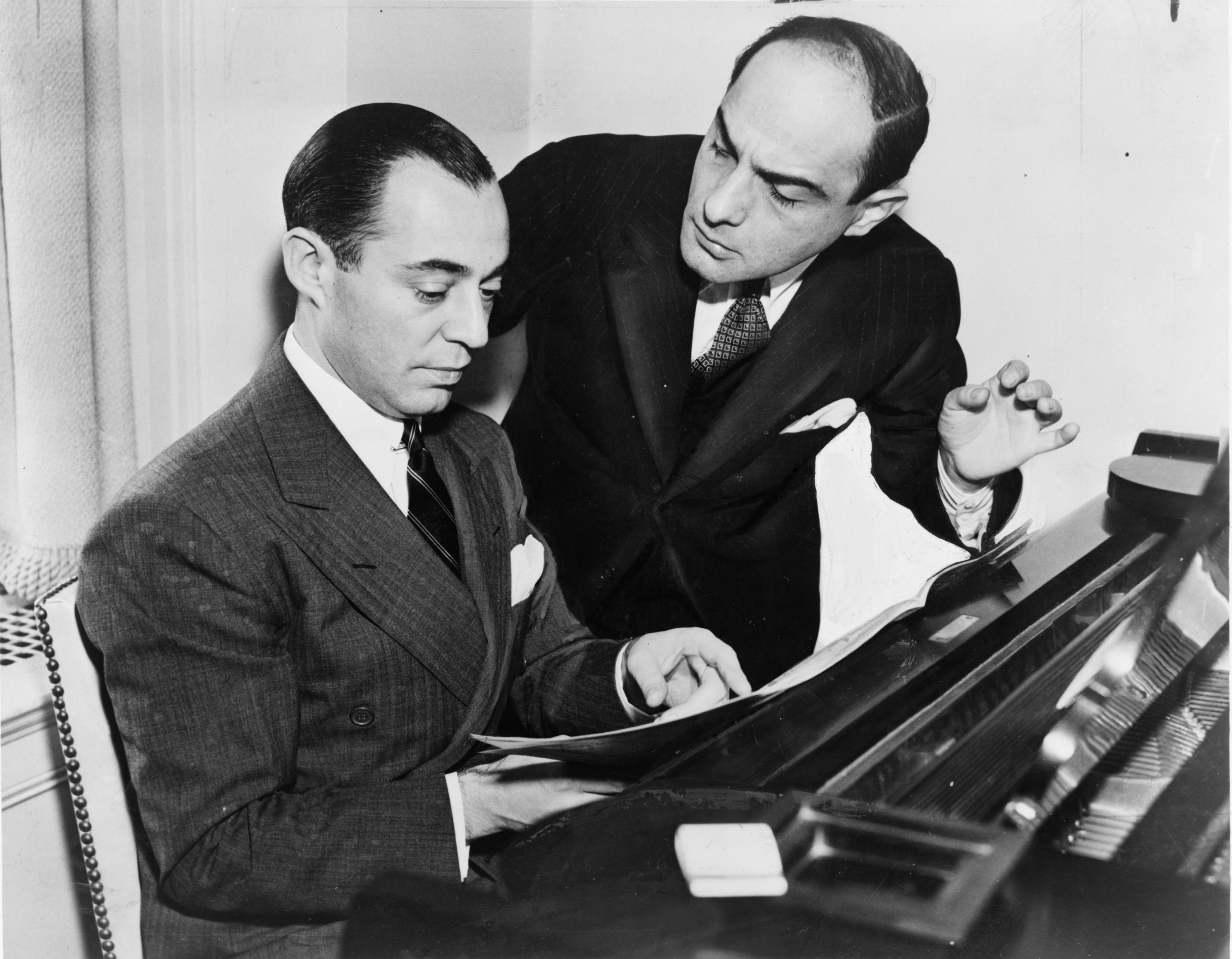
Rodgers and Hart

However, a few creative teams began to build on Show Boat's innovations, experimenting with musical satire, topical books and operatic scope. Of Thee I Sing (1931), a political satire with music by George Gershwin and lyrics by Ira Gershwin and Morrie Ryskind, was the first musical awarded the Pulitzer Prize. As Thousands Cheer (1933), a revue by Irving Berlin and Moss Hart in which each song or sketch was based on a newspaper headline, marked the first Broadway show in which an African-American, Ethel Waters, starred alongside white actors. Waters' numbers included "Supper Time", a woman's lament for her husband who has been lynched. Porgy and Bess (1935), by the Gershwin brothers and DuBose Heyward, featured an all African-American cast and blended operatic, folk, and jazz idioms. It has entered the permanent opera repertory and, in some respects, it foreshadowed such "operatic" musicals as West Side Story and Sweeney Todd. The Cradle Will Rock (1937), with a book and score by Marc Blitzstein and direction by Orson Welles, was a highly political pro-union piece that, despite the controversy surrounding it, managed to run for 108 performances. Richard Rodgers and Lorenz Hart's I'd Rather Be Right (1937) was a political satire with George M. Cohan as President Franklin D. Roosevelt, and Kurt Weill's Knickerbocker Holiday, based on source writings by Washington Irving, depicted New York City's early history while good-naturedly satirizing the good intentions of President Franklin D. Roosevelt.

Despite the economic woes of the decade and the competition from film, the musical survived. In fact, the move towards political satire in Of Thee I Sing, I'd Rather Be Right and Knickerbocker Holiday, together with the musical sophistication of the Gershwin, Kern, Rodgers and Weill musicals and the fast-paced staging and naturalistic dialogue style created by director George Abbott, showed that musical theatre was beginning to evolve beyond the gags and showgirls musicals of the Gay Nineties and Roaring Twenties and the sentimental romance of operetta. Rodgers and Hammerstein's Oklahoma! (1943) completed the revolution begun by Show Boat, by tightly integrating all the aspects of musical theatre, with a cohesive and more serious plot, and songs and dances that furthered the action of the story and developed the characters. It was also the first "blockbuster" Broadway show, running a total of 2,212 performances, and was made into a hit film.

== See also ==
- History of opera
- Long-running musical theatre productions
- Theatre music
- Show tunes

== Notes and references ==
=== Cited books ===
- Allen, Robert C. (c. 1991). Horrible prettiness: burlesque and American culture. University of North Carolina. p. 350. ISBN 978-0-8078-1960-9.
- Bradley, Ian (2005). Oh Joy! Oh Rapture! The Enduring Phenomenon of Gilbert and Sullivan. Oxford University Press. ISBN 0-19-516700-7.
- Buelow, George J. (2004). A history of baroque music. Bloomington, IN: Indiana University Press. p. 701. ISBN 978-0-253-34365-9.
- Carter, Tim; Butt, John, eds. (2005). The Cambridge history of seventeenth-century music. The Cambridge History of Music. Vol. 1. Cambridge University Press. p. 591. ISBN 978-0-521-79273-8. Archived from the original on 2013-01-12.
- Cullen, Frank (2007). Vaudeville Old & New: An Encyclopedia of Variety Performers in America, Vol. 2. Bloomington, IN: Taylor & Francis Group Publishing.
- Easterling, Patricia; Hall, Edith (2002). Greek and Roman Actors: Aspects of an Ancient Profession. New York, NY: Cambridge University Press. ISBN 978-0-52165-140-0.
- Everett, William A.; Laird, Paul R., eds. (2002). The Cambridge companion to the musical. Cambridge companions to music. Cambridge University Press. p. 310. ISBN 978-0-521-79189-2.
- Flinn, Denny M. (c. 1997). Musical! : a grand tour: the rise, glory and fall of an American institution. New York: Schirmer Books. p. 556. ISBN 978-0-02-864610-7.
- Hoppin, Richard H., ed. (1978). Anthology of medieval music. Norton introduction to music history. New York, NY: Norton. ISBN 978-0-393-09080-2.
- Lawrence, A. W., Greek Architecture, 1957, Penguin, Pelican history of art
- Jones, John B. (2003). Our Musicals, Ourselves. Hanover: University Press of New England. ISBN 978-1-58465-311-0.
- Lubbock, Mark (2002) [1962]. "American musical theatre: an introduction". The Complete Book of Light Opera (1st ed.). London: Putnam. pp. 753–56.
- Morley, Sheridan (c. 1987). Spread a little happiness: the first hundred years of the British musical. London: Thames and Hudson. p. 224. ISBN 978-0-500-01398-4.
- Parker, Roger, ed. (2001). The Oxford illustrated history of opera. Oxford illustrated histories (illustrated ed.). Oxford University Press. p. 541. ISBN 978-0-19-285445-2.
- Rubin, Don; Solórzano, Carlos, eds. (2000). The World Encyclopedia of Contemporary Theatre: The Americas. New York City: Routledge. ISBN 0-415-05929-1.
- Wilmeth, Don B.; Miller, Tice L., eds. (1996). Cambridge guide to American theatre (2nd ed.). Cambridge University Press. ISBN 978-0-521-56444-1.
