= William Jourdan Rapp =

Writer

William Jourdan Rapp (June 17, 1895 – 1942) was a writer and editor in the United States. He wrote plays, novels, and radio scripts. He edited True Story magazine.

Rapp was born in New York City. He graduated from Cornell in 1917 and worked as a health inspector in New York City until World War I. He served in France. After the war he also worked in Turkey.

He kept a scrapbook during his time at a YMCA camp in Greece. He went on to edit the popular True Story magazine and various radio series. In 1925 he wrote a piece in the New York Times about French Royalists.

He wrote with Wallace Thurman, Hughes Allison, and Lowell Brentano.

He married actress Virginia Venable Rapp and had a son and daughter.

== Plays ==
- Osman Pasha
- Whirlpool (1929)
- Hilda Cassidy
- Substitute for Murder
- Holmses of Baker Street
- Harlem: A Melodrama of Negro Life in Harlem written with Wallace Thurman, adapting Thurman's first novel The Blacker the Berry to the stage
- Jeremiah the Magnificent written with Wallace Thurman about Marcus Garvey and "Black Mecca"

== Books ==
- When I Was a Boy in Turkey
- Looking Down from Olympus
- Poolroom
