= Lulu Belle (play) =

Four-act stageplay by Sheldon and MacArthur

Lulu Belle is a play in four acts by Edward Sheldon and Charles MacArthur. It is set in San Juan Hill (an African American section on Manhattan's west side), Harlem, and Paris. One of the settings is a fictional Harlem nightclub called Elite Grotto. A play about a black prostitute from Harlem who seduced a white married man, it was controversial at the time and there were highly publicized attempts to censor and ban the play from performance at the time of its Broadway debut in 1926. The play was banned from performance in Boston by the city's mayor in 1928.

The Broadway production was directed by David Belasco, and was a hit in spite of the controversy surrounding the work. The original cast included Lenore Ulric, Henry Hull (both in blackface) and Elizabeth Williams.

Spencer Williams was involved in the production of an adaptation with an African American cast. The 1948 film Lulu Belle was also adapted from the original play.

The lead roles of Lulu Belle and George Randall were portrayed by Lenore Ulric and Henry Hull in blackface.
