= Peter P. Jones =

American photographer and filmmaker

Peter P. Jones was a photographer and filmmaker in the United States. He established the Peter P. Jones Film Company in Chicago in 1914 and filmed African American subjects including vaudeville acts and the 1915 National Half Century Exposition and Lincoln Jubilee. He also filmed community documentaries, chronicling contemporary African American life and social organizations.

According to a front page story in the Chicago Defender, Jones established his film company with funding from South American investors. The company had an office at 3849 State Street. His 1916 film Re-Birth of a Nation was a response to The Birth of a Nation. He later established the Seminole Film Producing Company in New York City, but it never completed its first film project, Shadows and Sunshine, an adaptation of a story by Jesse Shipp.

Jones photographed Booker T. Washington. He also photographed Henry O. Tanner, Bert Williams, Aida Overton Walker, and W. E. B. Du Bois.

== Filmography ==
- The Troubles of Sambo and Dinah
- 50 Years of Freedom
- Dawn of Truth (for the Honor of the 8th)
- The Slacker
- The Accidental Ruler
- Re-Birth of a Nation (1916)
