= J. Rosamond Johnson =

American classical composer (1873–1954)

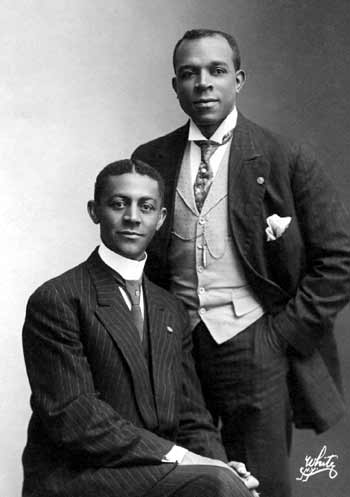
J. Rosamond Johnson, right, with Bob Cole

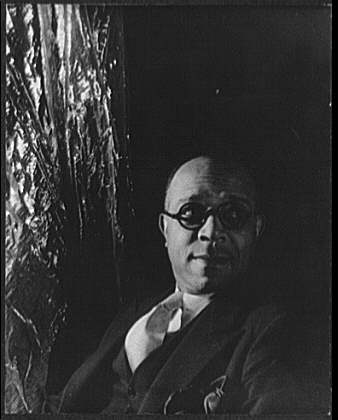
J. Rosamond Johnson, photo by Carl Van Vechten (1933)

John Rosamond Johnson (August 11, 1873 – November 11, 1954), usually referred to as J. Rosamond Johnson, was an American composer and singer during the Harlem Renaissance. Born in Jacksonville, Florida, much of his music career was in New York City. Johnson is hailed well over a century later as the composer of the civic anthem "Lift Every Voice and Sing", first performed live by 500 Black American students from racially-segregated Jacksonville, Florida's Edwin Stanton School in the pivotal year of 1900.

J. Rosamond Johnson was the younger brother of poet and activist James Weldon Johnson, who wrote the lyrics for "Lift Every Voice and Sing" and a number of other songs composed by his brother. The two also worked together in causes related to the NAACP.

== Biography ==
J. Rosamond Johnson was born on August 11, 1873 in Jacksonville, Florida, the son of James Johnson, a biracial preacher and headwaiter at the St. James Hotel, a luxury establishment built when Jacksonville was one of Florida's first winter resort destinations, and Helen Louise Dillet, a musician and the first African American female teacher in Florida.

Both of his parents were emigres from the Bahamas. His maternal great-grandmother, Hester Argo, had escaped from Saint-Domingue (now Haiti) during the revolutionary upheaval in 1802, along with her three young children, including Johnson's grandfather, Stephen Dillet (1797–1880). Although originally headed to Cuba, their boat was intercepted by privateers and they were brought instead to Nassau, Bahamas, where they settled permanently. In 1833 Stephen Dillet was the first man of color to win election to the Bahamian legislature.

Johnson was a musical prodigy, an accomplished pianist at age four. He attended the New England Conservatory and studied in London. His career began as the musical director of the Bethel Baptist Church his hometown of Jacksonville, Florida. While working as a public school teacher at the Edwin Stanton School in Jacksonville, where his mother had taught and his brother was the principal, he composed the melody for Lift Every Voice and Sing. The song was published by Joseph W. Stern & Co., Manhattan, New York (later the Edward B. Marks Music Company).

Traveling to New York with his older brother, they began their show business career with composer Bob Cole. As a songwriting team, they wrote works such as The Evolution of Ragtime (1903). Among the earliest works by the group was a suite of six songs of "Negro" music; Johnson and his brother also created the spiritual "Dem Bones".

The men also produced two successful Broadway operettas with casts of Black actors: Shoo-Fly Regiment of 1906 and The Red Moon of 1908.

Johnson also performed in these operettas. He played a Tuskegee soldier who enlists in the Spanish–American War in The Shoo Fly Regiment and portrayed African-American Plunk Green opposite Abbie Mitchell's Minnehaha, a mixed Indian/Black woman, in The Red Moon.

These performances went beyond theatre. Rosamond, alongside his brother and Cole, evoked a political presence in their inclusion of other races in their musicals. In The Red Moon, Cole and Johnson broke racial lines as they included a love scene between Rosamond's Green and Mitchell's Minnehaha. This spotlight on Native Americans was so well received that Rosamond was inducted as a 'sub-chief' into the Iroquois tribe of Montreal's Caughnawaga Reservation, which had a majority population of ethnic Mohawk people. Johnson was also one of the first African Americans to join the Actors’ Equity Association, advocating for the fair treatment of Black performers.

Cole and the Johnson brothers also created and produced several "white" musicals: Sleeping Beauty and the Beast in 1901, In Newport in 1904, and Humpty Dumpty in 1904. Johnson would also collaborate to create Hello Paris with J. Leubrie Hill in 1911.

Johnson was active in other musical roles during his career. He toured the vaudeville circuit with Cole and, after Cole's 1911 death, began a successful tour with Charles Hart and Tom Brown.

In 1912 the impresario Oscar Hammerstein appointed Johnson as musical director of his Grand Opera House in London, making Johnson the first African American to serve in this capacity in a white theatrical (light opera) company. After returning to the United States in 1913 he became the first director of New York's Music School Settlement for Colored People, founded by the New York Symphony Orchestra's David Mannes, from 1914 to 1919. Johnson also served as the first Deputy Marshal for the historic Negro Silent Protest Parade in 1917 led by the NAACP and organized by his brother James.

When World War I began Johnson received a commission as a 2nd Lieutenant in the 15th Regiment of the New York State National Guard, also known as the "Harlem Hellfighters". After the war, he toured with his own ensembles, "The Harlem Rounders" and "The Inimitable Five".

As an editor, he collected four important works of traditional African-American songs. He compiled the first two of these song collections with his brother James: The Book of American Negro Spirituals (1925) and The Second Book of Negro Spirituals (1926). In addition, Johnson edited Shoutsongs (1936) and the folksong anthology Rolling Along in Song (1937). He also performed in Negro spiritual concerts with Emmanuel Taylor Gordon, including at Aeolian Hall in Manhattan.

Johnson created vocal arrangements for the 1933 film version of Eugene O'Neill's play The Emperor Jones starring Paul Robeson. He and W.C. Handy are also credited as the musical arrangers on St. Louis Blues, a 1929 short film starring Bessie Smith and featuring James P. Johnson accompanying her on piano. Johnson co-wrote and had a minor role in Keep Punching, a 1939 film starring Henry Armstrong as a boxer and also featuring Dooley Wilson and Canada Lee.

The London production of Lew Leslie's Blackbirds of 1936 engaged Johnson as musical director. During the 1930s, Johnson also sang the role of Frazier in the original production of Gershwin's Porgy and Bess, taking roles in other dramas as well. He reprised his role as Frazier on the 1951 studio recording of Porgy and Bess. Although he did not write another musical comedy, Johnson continued to compose songs, instruct young people in music and serve as a "theater doctor" for many plays until his death in 1954.

== Personal life and death ==
Johnson met and married his wife Nora E. Floyd Johnson while in London in 1912 and 1913. They had a daughter, Mildred Johnson Edwards, and an adopted son, Donald McQuivey Johnson.

Their daughter, Mildred Johnson Edwards, founded Harlem's first private school, the Modern School at 539 West 152d Street, in 1934, while she was still in school, as she needed practical experience to complete her degree but was unable to find a private school that would accept a Black student teacher. She transferred management of the school and sold the school building in 1999; the school remained in operation until 2007.

Her mother, Nora Floyd Johnson, was also active in the school's administration. She would, as one student there recalled, greet students as they arrived, "giving you the 'eye' and letting you know that you were entering a building built on seriousness, focus, and integrity."

From 1933 to 1965 Mildred Johnson also ran Camp Dunroven, a summer sleepaway camp located first at Greenwood Lake and later Pine Bush, New York. The camp was one of few such camps available for Black children at the time.

John Rosamond Johnson died on November 11, 1954, in New York City. His widow, Nora E. Floyd Johnson, died in 1969.

Their adopted son, Donald McQuivey Johnson, a 20-year-old Bard College student, fatally shot himself in his dorm room five months after his father's death.

Nora Johnson died in 1969; her daughter passed away in 2007.

== Musical works ==
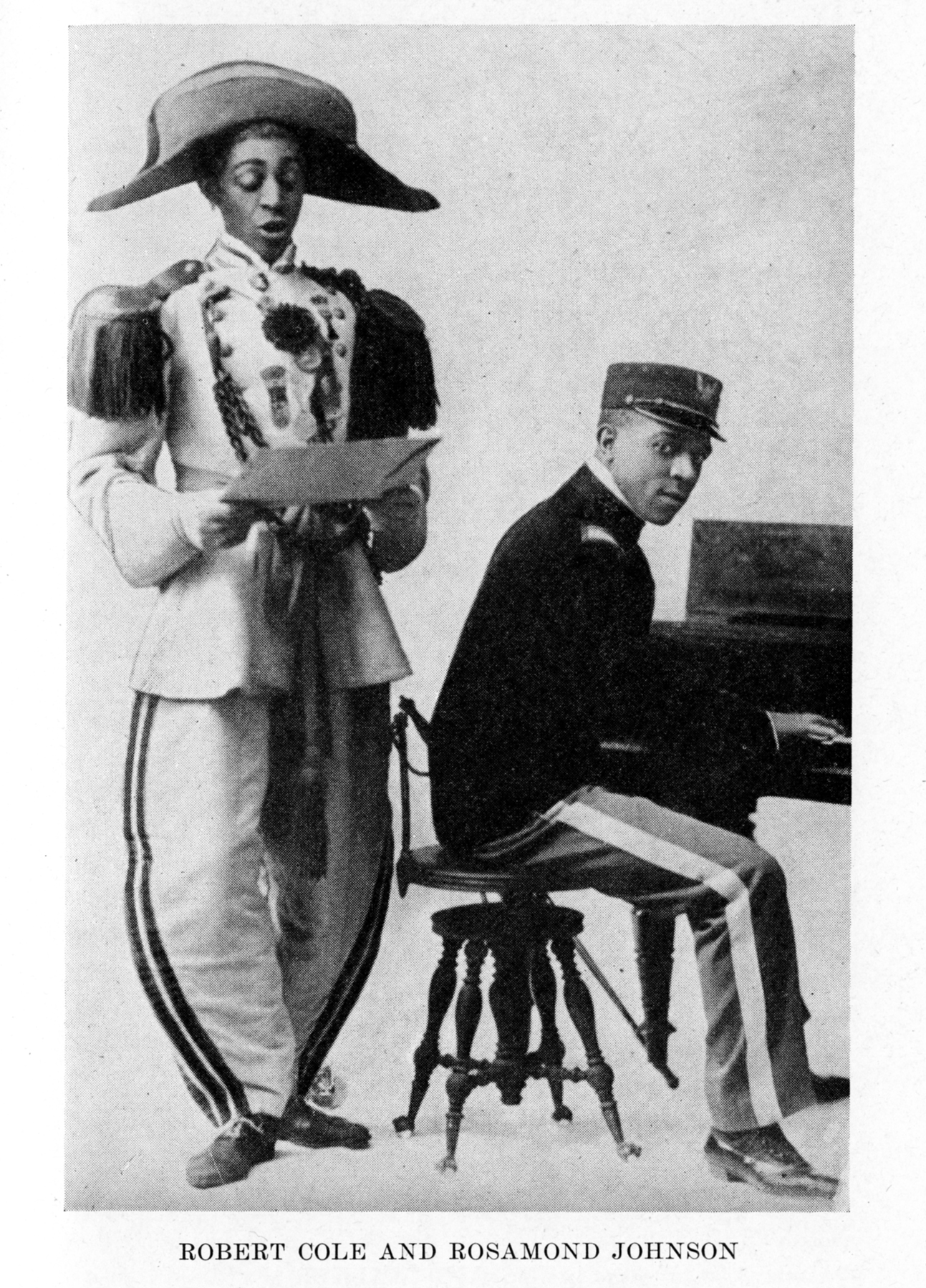
Robert Cole and Rosamond Johnson

- The Sleeping Beauty and the Beast (1901), musical
- "My Castle On The Nile", song (1901)
- "My heart's desiah is Miss Mariah" (1901), song
- "Mudder Knows" (1903), song
- In Newport (1904), musical
- Humpty Dumpty (1904), musical
- "I'll Keep a Warm Spot in My Heart For You" (1906), song
- The Shoo-Fly Regiment (1906), Broadway operetta
- The Red Moon (1908), Broadway operetta
- Mr. Lode of Koal (1909), musical
- Come Over Here (1912), musical
- "The Maiden with the Dreamy Eyes", song
- "Didn't He Ramble", song
- "Li'l Gal", song
- "Since You Went Away", song
- "Lift Every Voice and Sing", song
- "The Siberian Dip" (1911), ragtime instrumental

== See also ==
- The Frogs (club)
- African American musical theater
