= God's Trombones =

Book of poems by James Weldon Johnson

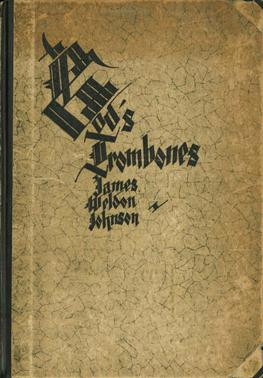
The cover to the 1927 edition of God's Trombones: Seven Negro Sermons in Verse by James Weldon Johnson, with artwork by Aaron Douglas

God's Trombones: Seven Negro Sermons in Verse is a 1927 book of poems by James Weldon Johnson patterned after traditional African-American religious oratory. African-American scholars Henry Louis Gates and Cornel West have identified the collection as one of Johnson's two most notable works, the other being Autobiography of an Ex-Colored Man.

== Origins ==
Johnson observed an absence of attention in folklore studies to what he called a "folk sermon," then went on to describe its nature and specific examples from his memory:

I remember hearing in my boyhood sermons that were current, sermons that passed with only slight modifications from preacher to preacher and from locality to locality. Such sermons were: "The Valley of Dry Bones," which was based on the vision of the prophet in the 37th chapter of Ezekiel; the "Train Sermon," in which both God and the devil were pictured as running trains, one loaded with saints, that pulled up in heaven, and the other with sinners, that dumped its load in hell; the "Heavenly March," which gave in detail the journey of the faithful from earth, on up through the pearly gates to the great white throne. Then there was a stereotyped sermon which had no definite subject, and which was quite generally preached; it began with the Creation, went on to the fall of man, rambled through the trials and tribulations of the Hebrew Children, came down to the redemption by Christ, and ended with the Judgment Day and a warning and an exhortation to sinners.

Johnson explains the title's use of the trombone by discussing the vocal and rhetorical qualities of a preacher he had recently heard who, he felt, exemplified the compelling and persuasive nature of the folk preacher, naming the trombone as "the instrument possessing above all others the power to express the wide and varied range of emotions encompassed by the human voice — and with greater amplitude." He also cited a dictionary definition that noted the trombone as being the brass instrument most resembling the range and sound of the human voice.

The seven poems were composed primarily in 1926, with "Go Down[,] Death" being composed in the space of a single afternoon on Thanksgiving Day, 1926, and the remaining five poems during a two-week retreat; "The Creation," the first poem of the set, had been composed about 1919.

== Reception ==
The work went on to find acclaim in many circles, proving "enormously popular among both the black cognoscenti as well of the masses of black Americans" and being used widely in oratorical contests; poet Owen Dodson wrote Johnson in 1932 to tell him that Dodson and his brother had taken first and second place in a poetry-recitation competition with works from that volume.

Gates and West particularly note that the work "attempts a mimetic capturing of the black church sermon... without making recourse to the misspellings and orthographic tricks often employed in representing black vernacular speech." Dorothy Canfield Fisher, in a personal letter to the poet to thank him and offer to help promote the collection, praised the work as "heart-shakingly beautiful and original, with the peculiar piercing tenderness and intimacy which seems to me special gifts of the Negro. ...it is a profound satisfaction to find those special qualities so exquisitely expressed."

The poem "The Creation" was used in the 1951 film Five, serving as the soliloquy for the character Charles, played by African-American actor Charles Lampkin. Lampkin convinced film-maker Arch Oboler to include excerpts of the poem in the final script of Five where it would become Lampkin's soliloquy for his character Charles. This may be the first time that audiences in the USA, Latin America, and Europe were exposed to African-American poetry, albeit not identified as such in the film.

== Poems ==
The book comprises eight poems:

- "Listen, Lord — A Prayer" – an invocation
- "The Creation" – A narrative retelling of the creation of human as told in the Bible. Instead of being a distant force, the Creator character is imbued with personality and speaks in familiar language.
- "The Prodigal Son" – from the biblical parable of the prodigal son
- "Go Down Death — A Funeral Sermon" – in which Jesus is depicted as sending his servant, Death, to bring to heaven a weary woman who is old and ready to die, so that she can rest
- "Noah Built the Ark" – retelling the biblical stories of Adam and Eve, a story of how sin entered the world, and of Noah and the Great Flood sent to cleanse the earth
- "The Crucifixion" – telling the story of Jesus' crucifixion
- "Let My People Go" – telling the biblical story of Moses and his work freeing the Hebrew slaves from Egypt, which has often been the basis of comparisons to the African-American slavery experience in the United States
- "The Judgment Day" – the prophetic story of the Apocalypse

== Bibliography ==
- Byrd, Rudolf, ed. (2008), The essential writings of James Weldon Johnson, Random House, ISBN 9781588368164.
- Gates, Henry Louis; West, Cornel (2002), The African-American century: how Black Americans have shaped our country, Simon & Schuster, ISBN 9780684864150.
- Johnson, James Weldon (1964) [1927], God's trombones: seven negro sermons in verse (hardback), Douglas, Aaron Ill; Falls, CB lettering, New York: Viking.
