= Charles Lampkin =

American actor (1913–1989)

- Lampkin in 1962
- Born: March 17, 1913; Montgomery, Alabama, US
- Died: April 17, 1989 (aged 76); San Jose, California, US
- Education: John Carroll University, Cleveland School of Music
- Occupations: Actor, Musician and Lecturer
- Years active: 1951–1989
- Website: www.charleslampkin.org

Charles Lampkin (March 17, 1913 – April 17, 1989) was an American actor, musician and lecturer.

== Early life ==
Charles Lampkin was born in Ward 4 of Montgomery, Alabama. He was the third son of Edgar Lampkin and Sarah Bidell. His paternal lineage is traced to British slave-owners and his maternal ancestors were Africans enslaved in the British colonies of Virginia and Georgia before the American Revolution of 1776. His great-grandmother Ann Lampkin, an emancipated slave, was one of the first people to befriend a twenty-five-year-old Booker T. Washington when he arrived in Alabama in 1881. She secured land and along with her church sisters raised funds for the Tuskegee Institute. Edgar Lampkin moved his family from Montgomery to Cleveland in the 1920s, part of the Great Migration.

== Career ==
Lampkin was a pioneer of Spoken Word in the 1930s and winner of Ohio debating cups in 1939, 1940 and 1941. In Arch Oboler's Five, the first science fiction film about a nuclear holocaust, Lampkin introduced Oboler to The Creation by James Weldon Johnson and convinced him to include excerpts of it in the script of Five. It would become Lampkin's soliloquy and may be the first time that wide audiences in the United States, Latin America and Europe were exposed to African-American poetry, albeit not identified as such.

Charles Lampkin served as music director of the American Peoples' Chorus from 1943 to 1945. On June 26, 1944, he conducted Paul Robeson and the APC at the historic Negro Freedom Rally at Madison Square Garden. Uta Hagen and Cardinal Spellman were in attendance.

He composed a piano concerto in G minor before 1955 and in 1969 was appointed Artist-in-residence, Professor of Music and Theatre Arts, at Santa Clara University until 1981.

He was nominated for an Emmy Award in 1979 for his performance in the ABC after-school special Home Run for Love, which aired on national television in the United States in October, 1978 and was re-broadcast in April, 1980.

In 1979 Lampkin played Professor Loman in Alex Haley's Roots: The Next Generations.

In the 1960s and 1970s Lampkin was a pioneer of multi-cultural pedagogy in California.

=== Lecture-recitations ===
In his college classes, Charles Lampkin divided original African-American music into four parts: Spirituals, the Shout Song, the Work Song and the Blues.

Charles Lampkin's performances of the poetry of the Harlem Renaissance set to music he composed were recorded in 1957 for the National Association of English Teachers. The records were distributed to thousands of schools across the United States. The original recording are available at the Charles Lampkin Foundation web site.

The centerpiece of the Charles Lampkin lecture platform was the Black American classic (whose status he helped secure) The Creation from the imaginative sermon series of James Weldon Johnson's God's Trombones.

=== Academia ===
In January 1969, Lampkin joined the College of Humanities faculty at the University of Santa Clara as an artist-in-residence, teaching a course in beginning acting and another one in ethnic music (until his retirement in 1981). He was also a lecturer at the University of the Pacific (Black Studies Program).

== Charles Lampkin Foundation ==
In 2011, Charles Lampkin's grandson Daniel Bruno created the Charles Lampkin Foundation as a non-profit that aims to counter anti-Intellectualism and the degrading effects of contemporary culture via awareness of the Harlem Renaissance. The foundation produced a series of videos which utilize Charles Lampkin's 1957 narration combined with relevant historical figures. A two-hour documentary Dreams From My Grandfather combines a movie review of Arch Oboler's Five along with rare historical footage of World War II and the nuclear arms race. With a music score including Sibelius, Holst, Vaughn Williams, Mahler and Bing Crosby, Daniel Bruno's narration includes geopolitical analysis of Japan's motives for siding with the Axis powers and Roosevelt's foreknowledge of the attack on Pearl Harbor. Outstanding renditions of Negro spirituals by Paul Robeson are heard throughout and in a final twist of irony, the documentary closes with the 10,000 strong Osaka volunteer choir performing Beethoven's "Ode To Joy" in 2009.

== Filmography ==
Year	Title	Role	Notes
1951	Five	Charles	Film
1961	Surfside 6	Monsieur Servat	TV series
1962	Rider on a Dead Horse	Taylor	Film
1962	The Law and Mr. Jones	Headwaiter / Tom Redford / Hecktel, The Storyville Gang	TV series
1962	Saints and Sinners	Hayes / Mr. Howard	TV series
1963	Alcoa Premiere	Zimmy	TV series
1963	The Untouchables	Hal Temple	TV series
1963	Toys in the Attic	Gus, Handyman	Film, Uncredited
1963	Twilight of Honor	Mr. Simmons	Film, Uncredited
1963	Mr. Novak	Robert Desmond	TV series
1963	Dr. Kildare	Eddie, Custodian	TV series
1964	One Man's Way	Lafe	Film
1965	Please Don't Eat the Daisies	Mr. Briggs	TV series
1962-1965	Ben Casey	Sam	TV series
1966	The Rare Breed	Porter	Film, Uncredited
1965-1966	The Long, Hot Summer	Andrew	TV series
1967	Run for Your Life	Dr. Herbert Garrison	TV series
1967	Tarzan	Matumba	TV series
1967	Accidental Family	Charlie	TV series
1967	Cowboy in Africa	Dr. Merar	TV series
1968	The Wild Wild West	Clerk	TV series
1968	Journey to Shiloh	Edward	Film, Uncredited
1968	The Thomas Crown Affair	Elevator Operator	Film, Uncredited
1968	It Takes a Thief	Gardener / Professor Kilghi	TV series
1968-1969	Julia	Charley / Electrician	TV series
1969	The Outsider	Richard	TV series
1969	The Bold Ones: The Protectors	Councilman	TV series
1969	Marcus Welby, M.D.	Mr. Murtree	TV series
1969	Hello, Dolly!	Laborer	Film, Uncredited
1968-1970	Mayberry R.F.D.	Ralph Barton	TV series
1970	The Name of the Game	Rubano	TV series
1970	Watermelon Man	Dr. Catlin	Film
1970	Barefoot in the Park		TV series
1967-1970	That Girl	Janitor / Mr. Hansen	TV series
1969-1970	The Bold Ones: The Lawyers	Barber / Ralph Miller	TV series
1970	The Most Deadly Game	Griggs	TV series
1970	Breakout	Cook	TV movie
1970	Ironside	Truck Driver	TV series
1971	Family Affair	Superintendent	TV series
1971	The Partridge Family	Heavy	TV series
1971	The Bill Cosby Show	Harold Morgan	TV series
1971	The Bold Ones: The Senator	Clerk	TV series
1971	The Interns	Judge Davidson	TV series
1964-1971	My Three Sons	Harry West / Herman / Mailman	TV series
1972	The Bold Ones: The New Doctors	Mailman	TV series
1972	Jigsaw		TV movie
1972	The Man	Congressman Walding	Film
1972	Hammer	Big Sid	Film
1972	The Odd Couple	Brother Lowell	Film
1972	McMillan & Wife	Judge Clement Williams	TV series
1972	The Delphi Bureau	Jason Thomas	TV series
1973	Emergency!	Airport Employee	TV series
1973	The Streets of San Francisco	Benjy Hoskins	TV series
1969-1973	The F.B.I.	Hargroves / The Broker	TV series
1973	Love Story	Father	TV series
1974	The Black Godfather	Danny's Father	Film
1974	That's My Mama	Will Harrington	TV series
1974	Hurricane	Wyn Stokey	TV movie
1974	The Law	Judge Rathman - Melendez Trial	TV movie
1974	Panic on the 5:22	George Lincoln	TV movie
1974	The Rookies	Sam Reese	TV series
1971-1975	Adam-12	Henry Ward / Johnson / Myron Bradley	TV series
1975	Wide World Mystery		TV series
1975	Cornbread, Earl and Me	Fred Jenkins	Film
1976	Special Delivery	Mailman	Film
1976	Gemini Man	Pop Kingston	TV series
1977	Islands in the Stream	Constable	Film
1977	Eleanor and Franklin: The White House Years	Irvin McDuffie	TV movie
1977	The Sanford Arms	Walter Calvin	TV series
1978	The Incredible Hulk	Joe	TV series
1978	ABC Afterschool Specials	Davy Henderson	TV series
1979	Roots: The Next Generations	Loman	TV mini-series
1979	Friends	Tug Summerfield	TV series
1980	House Calls		TV series
1975-1980	Barnaby Jones	Benny / Mort Rogers	TV series
1981	Quincy M.E.	Dr. Jamison	TV series
1981	S.O.B.	Butler	Film
1981	First Monday in October	Justice Josiah Clewes	Film
1982	Father Murphy		TV series
1982	Too Close for Comfort	Mr. Christmas	TV series
1983	Second Thoughts	Judge Richards	Film
1983	Bare Essence		TV series
1984	Last of the Great Survivors	Elroy	TV movie
1984	Scarecrow and Mrs. King	Mr. Feller	TV series
1984	The Jeffersons	Otis	TV series
1984	Highway to Heaven	Doc	TV series
1984	Ghost Warrior	Willie Walsh	Film
1985	Hunter	Judge	U.S. TV Series
1985	Street Hawk	Artie Shank	TV series
1985	Cocoon	Pops	Film
1985	Night Court	Grampa Robinson	TV series
1986	He's the Mayor	Ezra	TV series
1987	Webster	Sam	TV series
1987	227	Felix	TV series
1987	The Last Innocent Man	Judge Clement Autley	TV movie
1987-1988	Frank's Place	Tiger Shepin	TV series, (final appearance)
