= Five (1951 film) =

1951 film by Arch Oboler

- Theatrical release poster
- Directed by: Arch Oboler
- Screenplay by: Arch Oboler
- Story by: Arch Oboler
- Produced by: Arch Oboler
- Starring: William Phipps; Susan Douglas Rubeš; James Anderson; Charles Lampkin; Earl Lee
- Cinematography: Sid Lubow; Louis Clyde Stoumen
- Edited by: John Hoffman; Ed Spiegel; Arthur Swerdloff
- Music by: Henry Russell
- Production company: Arch Oboler Productions
- Distributed by: Columbia Pictures
- Release dates: April 25, 1951 (New York); August 28, 1951 (Los Angeles)
- Running time: 93 minutes (US); 89 minutes (UK)
- Country: United States
- Language: English
- Budget: $75,000

Five is a 1951 American independent horror/science-fiction film that was produced, written and directed by Arch Oboler. The film stars William Phipps, Susan Douglas Rubeš, James Anderson, Charles Lampkin and Earl Lee. Five was distributed by Columbia Pictures.

The film's plot involves one woman and four men, the apparent sole survivors of a war using a new type of atomic bomb. It appears to have annihilated the rest of the human race while leaving all infrastructure intact. The five people meet at a remote, isolated hillside house, where they try to determine how to survive and come to terms with the loss of their own personal worlds.

== Plot ==
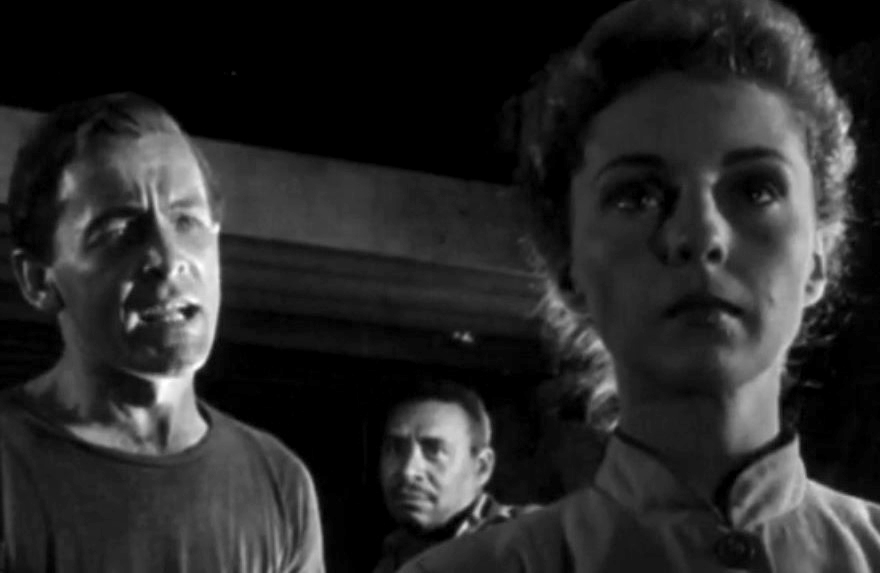
James Anderson, Charles Lampkin and Susan Douglas Rubeš in Five

Roseanne Rogers trudges from place to place, searching for another living human being. A newspaper headline reports a scientist's warning that detonating a new type of atomic bomb could cause the extinction of humanity. Roseanne arrives at her aunt's isolated hillside house and faints when she finds Michael already living there. At first, she is too numb to speak and slow to recover. She later resists Michael's attempted sexual assault and also reveals that she is married and pregnant.

Two more survivors arrive in a car, attracted by the smoke from the house's chimney. Oliver P. Barnstaple is an elderly bank clerk who is in denial, believing that he is simply on vacation. Since the atomic disaster, he has been under the care of the thoughtful and affable Charles. Both survived because they were accidentally locked in a bank vault when the disaster happened. Roseanne was in a hospital's lead-lined X-ray room, while Michael was in an elevator in the Empire State Building.

Barnstaple becomes ill and Michael suspects that is caused by radiation poisoning, but Barnstaple later appears to recover and insists on seeing the nearby ocean. They drag a man out of the ocean, a mountain climber named Eric who was stranded on Mount Everest by a blizzard during the disaster. He tells how he reached the base camp only to find everyone dead, then walked through Asia and Europe finding the same situation. He reached the sea and sailed to Hawaii, but there were only more bodies. He found a plane and flew to the mainland United States, crashing because of fuel starvation just short of land. Barnstaple dies peacefully on the beach.

The next day, Charles helps Michael with his construction project. Michael sees Roseanne bringing food to Eric and remarks that he believes that Eric is exaggerating his condition and that Roseanne should not be catering to his whims. Eric sows discord among the group and theorizes that they are immune to the radiation, and he wants to find other survivors. Michael is skeptical and warns that radiation will be most concentrated in the cities that Eric wants to search.

Eric reveals himself as a racist who cannot tolerate living with Charles, who is black. Charles and Eric fight, stopping only when Roseanne begins labor and gives birth to a boy, delivered by Michael. While the others work to make a better life, Eric wanders away alone and drives their jeep through the group's cultivated field, destroying some crops. Michael orders Eric to leave, but Eric produces a pistol and announces that he will leave only when he is ready.

Late one night, Eric tells Roseanne that he is going to the city of Oak Ridge. Hoping to discover her husband's fate, Roseanne agrees to accompany Eric as he had hoped, but he insists that she not tell Michael. After stealing supplies, Eric is stopped by Charles, and in the ensuing struggle, Eric stabs Charles in the back, killing him.

When they reach the city, Eric begins looting, while Roseanne finds her husband's office and then a nearby hospital's waiting room, where she discovers her husband's remains. She wants to return to Michael, but Eric refuses to free her. When they struggle, Eric's shirt is torn open, revealing signs of advanced radiation poisoning. In despair, he runs away.

Roseanne begins the long walk back to the house, but along the way, her baby dies. Michael, who has been searching for her, eventually finds her. After burying her son, they return to the house. Michael silently resumes cultivating the soil, and Roseanne joins him.

== Cast ==
- William Phipps as Michael Rogin
- Susan Douglas Rubeš as Roseanne Rogers
- James Anderson as Eric
- Charles Lampkin as Charles
- Earl Lee as Oliver P. Barnstaple

== Production ==
The unusual house that is the setting for most of the film was designed by Frank Lloyd Wright and was the separate guesthouse of the ranch of the film's producer, director and writer Arch Oboler, located at 32436 Mulholland Highway in Malibu, California. The house burned to the ground, with only its foundations remaining, during the 2018 Woolsey Fire.

Actor Charles Lampkin came to Oboler's notice when reading the prose poem "The Creation" by James Weldon Johnson on a Los Angeles television program. Oboler convinced him to include excerpts of the poem in the final script for Five.

Oboler shot the film for only $75,000, employing as his crew a small group of recent graduates from the University of Southern California film school and starring five unknown actors. Upon the film's completion, Oboler sold it to Columbia Pictures for a large profit.

== Release ==
The film's world premiere was held at the Holiday Theatre in New York on April 25, 1951.

The Los Angeles premiere was held at the Four Star Theater on August 28, 1951. In attendance were many stars such as Charles Boyer, Lou Costello, Robert Cummings, Arlene Dahl, Dan Duryea, Glenn Ford, Van Heflin, Boris Karloff, Hedy Lamarr, James Mason, Eleanor Powell, Ann Sheridan, Danny Thomas and John Wayne. Los Angeles television station KTTV broadcast a 30-minute live show from outside the theater, one of the earliest televised arrival of stars on the red carpet, which the Los Angeles Times described as "epochmaking".

== Reception ==
In a contemporary review for The New York Times, critic Bosley Crowther wrote:

[T]hese people are such a wretched crew that the skeptic is well provoked to wonder whether it wouldn't be better if everyone were killed. This impulse to skepticism should not be charged against the nature of man. Rather, it should be charged against Mr. Oboler, who wrote, directed and produced this film. For the five people whom he has selected to forward the race of man are so cheerless, banal and generally static that they stir little interest in their fate. Furthermore, Mr. Oboler has imagined so little of significance for them to do in their fearfully unique situation that there is nothing to be learned from watching them. Mr. Oboler might as well be presenting five castaways on a desert isle. ... Obviously, Mr. Oboler, in his manufacture of this film, had some sort of poetic drama or social allegory in mind. For the mood is solemn and ethereal, the pace is portentously slow and the pictorial details, while literal, are blandly illogical. ... And he hasn't the slightest hesitation to take reckless liberties with physical facts and reason in his post-atomic world ... Furthermore, he has charged his actors, all of whom are professionally obscure (in accord with his low-budget effort), to play in a stiff, monotonous style. This is apparently his method of displaying their shock and dismay. ... [A]n idea which bears some imaginative thought it reduced to the level of banality and somewhat "arty" pretense.

Reviewer John L. Scott of the Los Angeles Times wrote: "It is fanciful yet plausible, a shocker without comedy relief and a worthy effort by Mr. Oboler to provoke thought. ... This is a type of picture difficult to evaluate for a public seeking 'entertainment.' Oboler has made his characters into symbols and indulges in considerable preachment."

== Legacy ==
During the 1989 film Great Balls of Fire!, the characters Jerry Lee Lewis and his future wife Myra Gale Brown are seen watching Five in a scene.

== See also ==
- List of apocalyptic films
- List of apocalyptic and post-apocalyptic fiction
- List of science fiction films of the 1950s
