= 1833 Bahamian general election =

General elections were held in the Bahamas in December 1833. They were the first elections in which non-white residents were able to vote, and three non-white candidates were elected to the General Assembly; Stephen Dillet, Thomas Minns and John Deane.

== Background ==
General elections had previously been held in 1832. However, following a series of confrontations between the General Assembly and Governor Blayney Townley Balfour in 1833 over control of public buildings and the appointment of civil servants, Balfour dissolved the Assembly on 4 December 1833 after the Assembly voted by 21–2 to approve a resolution to withhold funding until the Governor accepted that the Assembly had control. Balfour ordered that elections be held within a fortnight, with the vote in Nassau set for 17 December.

== Electoral system ==
The elections were the first to be held under the 1833 Act to Relieve His Majesty's Free Coloured and Black Subjects of the Bahamas Islands From All Civil Disability, which gave free non-white men over 21 the right to vote and stand in general elections in the territory, though slaves were still excluded. Although property qualifications still severely restricted the franchise, with only around 4% of the population eligible to vote, several non-white candidates ran in the elections. The 25 members of the Assembly were elected in 13 constituencies ranging in size from one to four seats.

== Results ==
Constituency	Date of election	Candidate	Votes	%	Notes
Andros		Robert Duncome			Elected
Andros		John Pinder			Elected
Caicos		John McIntosh			Elected
Crooked Island		John Meadows			Elected
Eastern District	21 December	George Anderson			Elected
Eastern District	21 December	Conrad Duncome			Elected
Eleuthera		William Johnson			Elected
Eleuthera		Robert Millar			Elected
Eleuthera		William Knowles			Elected
Exuma		William Farrington			Elected
Exuma		Henry Armbrister			Elected
Exuma		John Meadows			Elected
Harbour Island		Henry Greenslade			Elected
Harbour Island		William Vesey Munnings Jr			Elected
Harbour Island		Hugh Kerr			Elected
Long Island		Henry Adderley			Elected
Nassau	16 December	George Wood	77	25.5	Elected
Nassau	16 December	Stephen Dillet	67	22.2	Elected
Nassau	16 December	John Storr	55	18.2	Elected
Nassau	16 December	Robert Butler	55	18.2	Elected
Nassau	16 December	Thomas Saunders	25	8.3	
Nassau	16 December	Thomas Forster	22	7.3	
Nassau	16 December	Neil M'Queen	1	0.3	
San Salvador		William Vesey Munnings Sr			Elected
Turks Island		Henshall Stubbs			Elected
Watlings Island & Rum Key		Charles Nesbitt			Elected
Western District	18 December	Thomas Minns	46	50.0	Elected
Western District	18 December	John Deane	46	50.0	Elected
Source: Hart, The Royal Gazette and Bahamas Advertiser

== Aftermath ==
Henry Adderley, the elected member for Long Island, claimed that he had been elected "contrary to his wish and consent", and asked to be excused from the Assembly. The Assembly was opened on 17 January 1834.

In July 1834, several by-elections were held to elect additional members; George Anderson and Thomas Cartwright were elected from Exuma, George Adderly and Benjamin Sims Jr were elected from Long Island, James Malcolm was elected from Harbour Island, and George Camplejohn and Samuel Clutsam were elected from Eleuthera.
