= Stephen Dillet =

Bahamian parliamentarian (1796–1880)

Stephen Dillet Sr. (1796 – 1880) was a businessman, civil rights leader, public official, and parliamentarian in the Bahamas. He was elected to the House of Assembly in the 1833 Bahamian general election, the colony's first to allow non-white voters.

== Biography ==
He was born in Saint-Domingue. Etienne Dillet and Hester Argo (Mary Cartherine Esther Argo / Hester Argeaux) were his parents. He was brought at age 6 with his mother to the Bahamas from Haiti. He was the maternal grandfather of the brothers James Weldon Johnson and J. Rosamond Johnson.

His sons Thomas William Dillet and Stephen Albert Dillet Jr. also became public officials. Stephen Dillet Primary School in Nassau, Bahamas is named for him.
