= The Autobiography of an Ex-Colored Man =

Book by James Weldon Johnson

- First edition
- Author: James Weldon Johnson
- Language: English
- Genre: African American Novel
- Publisher: Sherman, French, & Co.
- Publication date: 1912
- Publication place: United States
- Pages: 236

The Autobiography of an Ex-Colored Man (1912/1927) by James Weldon Johnson is the fictional account of a young biracial man, referred to only as the "Ex-Colored Man", living in post-Reconstruction era America in the late nineteenth and early twentieth centuries. He lives through a variety of experiences, including witnessing a lynching, that convince him to "pass" as white to secure his safety and advancement, but he feels as if he has given up his dream of "glorifying" the black race by composing ragtime music.

== History ==
Johnson originally published The Autobiography of an Ex-Colored Man anonymously in 1912, via the small Boston publisher Sherman, French, & Company. He decided to publish it anonymously because he was uncertain how the potentially controversial book would affect his diplomatic career. He wrote openly about issues of race and discrimination that were not common then in literature. The book's initial public reception was poor. It was republished in 1927, with some minor changes of phraseology, by Alfred A. Knopf, an influential firm that published many Harlem Renaissance writers, and Johnson was credited as the author.

Despite the title, the book is a novel. It is drawn from the lives of people Johnson knew and from events in his life. Johnson's text is an example of a roman à clef.

== Plot summary ==
The novel begins with a frame tale in which the unnamed narrator describes the narrative that follows as "the great secret of my life." The narrator notes that he is taking a substantial risk by composing the narrative, but that it is one he feels compelled to record, regardless. The narrator also chooses to withhold the name of the small Georgia town where his narrative begins, as there are still living residents of the town who might be able to connect him to the narrative.

Throughout the novel, the adult narrator from the frame interjects into the text to offer reflective commentary into the events of the narrative.

=== Early life ===
Born shortly after the Civil War in a small Georgia town, the narrator's African-American mother protected him as a child and teenager. The narrator's father, a wealthy white member of the Southern aristocracy, is absent throughout the narrator's childhood but, nevertheless, continues to provide financial support for the narrator and his mother. Because of that financial support, she had the means to raise her son in an environment more middle-class than many black people could enjoy at the time.

The narrator describes learning to love music at a young age as well as attending an integrated school. It is while attending this school that the narrator first realizes he is African-American and thus subject to ridicule and mistreatment for his racial heritage. This "discovery" occurs when he is publicly corrected by his teacher and the headmaster when he stands when "the white scholars" (schoolchildren) are asked to stand. Returning home from school, the distraught narrator confronts his mother, asking her if he is a "nigger." His mother reassures him, however, noting that while she is not white, "your father is one of the greatest men in the country—the best blood of the South is in you." The narrator notes that this event became a racial awakening and loss of innocence that caused him to suddenly begin searching for—and finding—faults in himself and his mother, setting the stage for his eventual decision (though far in the future) to "pass" as a white man.

While in school, the narrator also grows to admire and befriends "Shiny," an unmistakably African-American boy, who is described as one of the brightest and best-spoken children in the class.

After the narrator's mother dies, he becomes a poor orphan and subject to harsh conditions.

He adapted very well to life with lower-class black people and was able to move easily among the classes of black society. During this carefree period, he taught music and attended church, where he came in contact with upper-class black people. Living in an all black community, he discovers and describes three classes of black people: the desperate, the domestics, and the independent workmen or professionals.

The Ex-Colored Man believed the desperate class consists of lower-class black people who loathe the whites. The domestic worker class comprises black people who work as servants to whites. And the artisans, skilled workers, and black professionals class included black people who had little interaction with the whites. Many white readers, who viewed all black people as a stereotype of a single class, were unfamiliar with class distinctions described among black people.

=== Time with the Rich White Gentleman ===
While playing ragtime at a late night hotspot in New York, the Ex-Colored Man caught the attention of a wealthy white gentleman. The gentleman's liking for ragtime develops as liking for the Ex-Colored Man himself. The white gentleman hired him to play ragtime piano for guests at parties. Soon the Ex-Colored Man spent most of his time working for the white gentleman, who paid him to play ragtime music for hours at a time. He would play until the white gentleman would say "that will do." The Ex-Colored man would tire after the long hours but would continue playing as he saw the joy and serenity he brought the white gentleman.

The white gentleman frequently "loaned" the Ex-Colored Man out to other people to play at their parties. The gentleman was not "loaning" him out as a piece of property, but simply giving the narrator a broader palette to display his talents. The Ex-Colored man saw how the rich lived; he was thrilled to live in this lifestyle. The Rich White Gentleman influenced the Ex-Colored Man more than anyone else he met. In his relationship toward the Rich White Man he was aware of aspects of the slave/master, but saw there was also one of friendship. While he was with the white gentleman, the Ex-Colored Man decided he would use his skills to aid in abolitionism. Even though life was pleasant, it was void of substance; using his music to aid poor African Americans he felt would be a better use of his talents. The Ex-Colored Man continued to show devotion to the white gentleman, as the white gentleman treated him with kindness, which eventually led to the forming a friendship while in Paris.

The Ex-Colored Man's devotion to the white gentleman expresses the relationship that some slaves had with their masters (slaves who showed devotion to the slave-owner). Johnson suggests that, although the Ex-Colored Man had "freedom," he was still suffering from the effects of slavery. After playing for the white gentleman while touring Europe, the Ex-Colored Man decided to leave him and return to the South to study Negro spirituals. He planned to use his knowledge of classical and ragtime music to create a new Black American musical genre. He wanted to "bring glory and honor to the Negro race," to return to his heritage, and proud and self-righteous race.

While many critics have read the Rich White Gentleman in a variety of ways, Johnson's own paratextual archival material suggests that the relationship between the narrator and the patron is intended to parallel the real-life relationship between Johnson’s friend Al Johns, whom Johnson names in an earlier draft, and Johns’s own friend, Dr. Orville Summers.

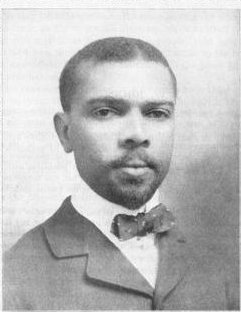
James Weldon Johnson

The narrator's time in Paris, however, is cut short when he goes to see a performance of Faust, during which he sits next to a beautiful young woman for whom he initially expresses great admiration. However, throughout the performance, he notices the young woman speaking to an older couple whom she refers to as "mother" and "father." The narrator is shocked when he recognizes the man as his own wealthy white father, whom he has not seen for ten years, and realizes that the two women must be the man's lawful wife and daughter, making the young woman the narrator's biological half-sister. This event leaves a deep impression upon the narrator and causes him to decide to leave the company of his patron (the Rich White Gentleman) to return to the United States on his mission of advancing African-American musical forms.

=== The Lynching ===
Just as the Ex-Colored Man began to work on his music in the South, he witnessed the lynching of a black man. The crowd wanted to hang the man but burned him instead. The Ex-Colored Man narrates in detail what he saw, "He squirmed, he withered, strained at his chains, then gave out cries and groans that I shall always hear." The narrator is horrified by the extent of this violent racism played out in the town square. He continues, "The cries and groans were choked off by the fire and smoke; but his eyes, bulging from their sockets, rolled from side to side, appealing in vain for help." The scene that day stuck vividly in his mind and burned a sharp image in his brain. He finishes with, "Some of the crowd yelled and cheered, others seemed appalled at what they had done, and there were those who turned away sickened at sight. I was fixed to the spot where I stood powerless to take my eyes from what I did not want to see".

After the lynching, the Ex-Colored Man decides to "pass" as white. He gives up his dream of making music to glorify his race and thinks he does not want to be "identified with people that could with impunity be treated worse than animals," or with people who could treat other humans that way. He simply wishes to remain neutral. The Ex-Colored Man declares that he "would neither disclaim the black race nor claim the white race."

=== Passing ===
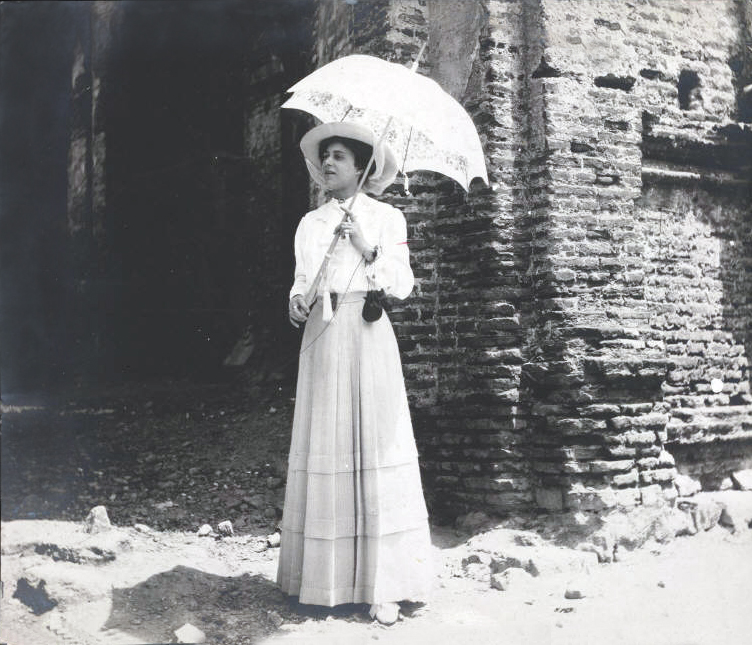
Grace Nail Johnson, wife of the author, in Panama where he was posted as a diplomat

The world accepted the Ex-Colored Man as white. Our narrator has been "passing" as a white man for the remainder of his life, and titles his autobiographical narrative "Ex-Colored Man." At the same time, the narrator learns that his childhood friend "Shiny" is now teaching as a professor at a Negro college, suggesting a contrast between himself, who has chosen to pass, and Shiny, who has embraced his African-American heritage.

The narrator eventually begins a courtship with a white woman, causing an internal dilemma as to whether or not to reveal his African-American heritage, and he asks her to marry him. After the two have a chance meeting with Shiny, in which the narrator is "surprised at the amount of interest a refined black man could arouse," the narrator decides to reveal his secret to her. At first shocked, she flees, and the narrator resolves to give her sufficient space to let her make up her mind. Eventually, she returns to him, having absorbed his revelation and chosen to accept him. They are eventually married and have two children, and the narrator lives out his life as a successful yet mediocre businessman.

His wife dies during the birth of their second child, leaving the narrator alone to raise their two children. At the end of the book, the Ex-colored Man says:

My love for my children makes me glad that I am what I am, and keeps me from desiring to be otherwise; and yet, when I sometimes open a little box in which I still keep my fast yellowing manuscripts, the only tangible remnants of a vanished dream, a dead ambition, a sacrificed talent, I cannot repress the thought, that after all, I have chosen the lesser part, that I have sold my birthright for a mess of pottage.

"Passing" could be interpreted as a decision to avoid the black race. He states that he "regrets holding himself back." He may have been implying that if he had, he embraced the Negro community and let the community embrace him, that he could have made a difference.

The Ex-Colored Man was one of the few people who was not held back by being black. He had a strong education, smart wits, and light skin. The masses all assumed he was white. However, his talent was in black music. Because of his fear of being a Negro, he threw away his talent as a musician to "become" a white man. This is one portrayal of the social strains due to racial discrimination; he felt that society forced him to choose between his love of African-American music and the safety and convenience of being white with the majority. The white gentleman fully accepted the Ex-Colored Man for who he was, but he feared that others would not. He decided to protect his mixed-race children by having them grow up "white." He wanted to give them every advantage he could.

== Themes ==
=== Race, Passing, and the Tragic mulatto ===
The narrator in some ways reflects the trope of the tragic mulatto, however, rather than suffering a catastrophic downfall; as a result, the narrator's tragedy is much more subversive. The "Ex-colored Man" is compelled by fear, not only for himself but for his children's sake (so they can grow up "white"), to exist in degraded mediocrity, despite his apparent potential and lofty goals of advancing the African-American race. In this way, his boyhood friend, "Shiny," and his symbolic name, act as a foil for the narrator. The narrator has admired since childhood, his inability to "pass" forces him to accomplish, rather than merely aspire as the narrator does. At the end of the novel, Shiny has risen to refinement and prestige while embracing his racial heritage and contributing to the community, while the narrator is relegated to mediocrity and obscurity, unable to risk revealing his racial background.

A major shift in the plot occurs during a performance of "Faust" in Paris, when the narrator sees his wealthy white father and his legitimate family, including his biological half-sister. Throughout the novel, the narrator is locked in a continual cycle of bargaining. The final bargain is trading his aspirations and talents for mediocrity to "pass" and allow his children to pass, raising the question as to whether this is damnation or continual striving.

== Reception and later criticism ==
This scene is interesting not so much for the way the stereotypical attitudes of the Northerner and Southerner are depicted, but rather for what it fails to disclose and for the way the Jew and the narrator himself are positioned as the scene unfolds. What the narrator does not reveal is that the smoking-compartment is, undoubtedly, for whites only. This is, after all, a portrayal of the Deep South at the turn of the twentieth century. The narrator is clearly "passing." As a "black" man, he would be denied access to such a space, a (purportedly) all-white and all-male hegemonic site. It is only by virtue of his "light skin" and the assumption of whiteness that he is privy to the discussion at all.

— Catherine Rottenberg

The impetus fueling Johnson's narrative experiment seems clearer if one summons to view the African-American male writers tradition. In his autobiography, 'Along This Way (1933),' Johnson maintains that he expected that the title, 'The Autobiography of an Ex-Colored Man,' would immediately reveal the work's ironic inflections and implicit relationship to prevailing discourses on black male subjectivity. He writes: "When I chose the title, it was without the slightest doubt that its meaning would be perfectly clear to anyone." (238). Although Johnson's ironic title borders on satire, the discursive subversion marked by satire is meaningless without a clear contextualization of the black male literary enterprise upon which satire would, as it were, "signify."

— Heather Russell Andrade
