= Fifty Years and Other Poems =

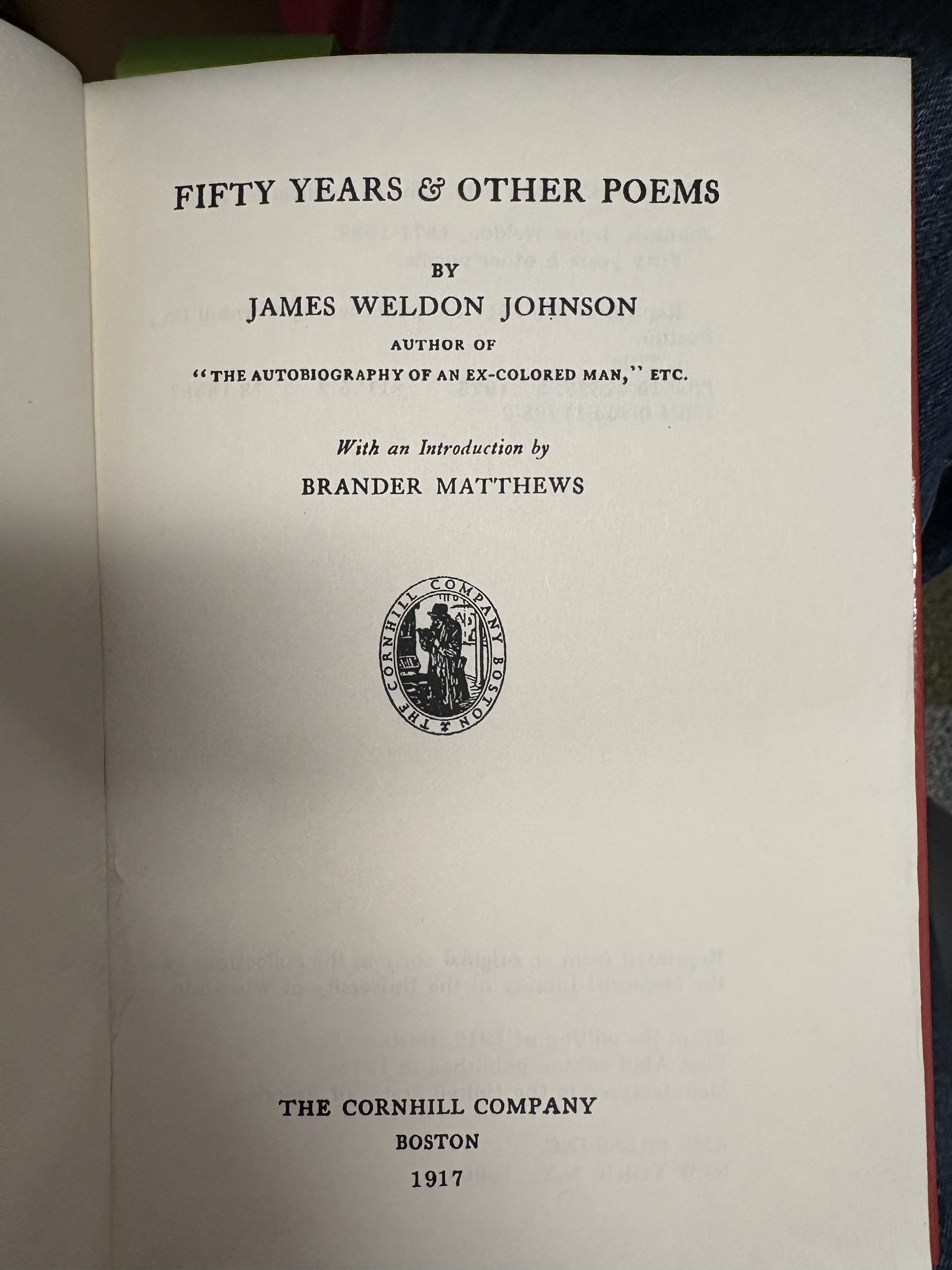
- Author: James Weldon Johnson
- Genre: Poetry Collection
- Publisher: The Cornhill Company
- Publication date: 1917

Fifty Years and Other Poems is a 1917 poetry collection by James Weldon Johnson. The poems date from 1900 to 1917, with many being published in other sources such as Century Magazine, The Independent, The Crisis, and The New York Times.

The poetry collection was published in 1917 by the Cornhill Company in Boston, Massachusetts with an introduction by Professor Brander Matthews of Columbia University.

In the work Johnson writes many poems containing both racial and non-racial themes but the most notable poems are ones containing racial themes.

The work has not been republished in modern times as it was one of his least successful works so it hasn't been reviewed by many people. However, Benjamin Brawley did write a review on it in The Journal of Negro History.

== Contents ==
Fifty Years and Other Poems consists of sixty-five poems, with the last sixteen being grouped into a category called "Jingles & Croons".

- Fifty Years
- To America
- O Black and Unknown Bards
- O Southland
- To Horace Bumstead
- The Color Sergeant
- The Black Mammy
- Father, Father Abraham
- Brothers
- Fragment
- The White Witch
- Mother Night
- The Young Warrior
- The Glory of the Day Was in Her Face
- From the Spanish of Placido
- From the Spanish
- From the German of Uhland
- Before a Painting
- I Hear the Stars Still Singing
- Girl of Fifteen
- The Suicide
- Down By the Carib Sea
  - Sunrise in the Tropics
  - Los Cigarillos
  - Teestay
  - The Lottery Girl
  - The Dancing Girl
  - Sunset in the Tropics
- The Greatest of These is War
- A Mid-Day Dreamer
- The Temptress
- Ghosts of the Civil Old Year
- The Ghost of Deacon Brown
- Lazy
- Omar
- Deep in the Quiet Wood
- Voluptas
- The Word of an Engineer
- Life
- Sleep
- Prayer at Sunrise
- The Gift to Sing
- Morning, Noon and Night
- Her Eyes Twin Pools
- The Awakening
- Beauty That is Never Old
- Venus in a Garden
- Vashti
- The Reward

Jingles & Croons

- Sence You Went Away
- Ma Lady's Lips Am Like de Honey
- Tunk
- Nobody's Lookin’ but de Owl an’ de Moon
- You's Sweet to Yo’ Mammy Jes de Same
- A Plantation Bacchanal
- July in Georgy
- A Banjo Song
- Answer to Prayer
- Dat Gal o’ Mine
- The Seasons
- ‘Possum Song
- Brer Rabbit, You’se de Cutes’ of ‘Em All
- An Explanation
- De Little Pickaninny’s Gone to Sleep
- The Rivals

== History ==
Some of the poems published in Fifty Years and Other Poems were originally published in other sources, but many were only published in this collection. After writing Fifty Years and Other Poems, Johnson sent the collection to Brander Matthews and William Stanley Braithwaite, both men liked the style and the perspective of the poems. They recommended the conventional arrangement of Black poetry collections, with the first poems being of racial and non-racial themes in standard English and the second part being in Black dialect. Johnson moved to Latin America while he was writing these poems and this allowed him to better observe the US racial scene and spurred some of his more racially themed poems as well as inspiring his poems about the Caribbean.

== Notable poems ==
The title poem "Fifty Years" was written to commemorate the fiftieth anniversary of the Emancipation Proclamation. It was originally written as a more racially pointed poem—a work containing 41 quatrains that focused on Black history in America from 1619 to 1913. However, Johnson opted for a final version that was more uplifting and focused on achievements and contributions of the Black population rather than calling for justice and equality. Nevertheless, two of the deleted stanzas from "Fifty Years" were added to the next poem in the collection "To America".

The first poem published was "Sence You Went Away", which was published by Century Magazine in dialect in 1900. It was later set to music by Rosamond Johnson, Johnson's brother.

"Brothers" is a poem of dialogue between a group of lynchers and their Black victim. The victim speaks out and claims his humanity which makes the lynchers feel uncomfortable. This poem's main purpose is to show that racial injustice not only affects Black people but the white oppressors as well, which is a theme Johnson advocated for most of his life.

The poem "Mother Night" is often seen as having a nonracial theme, but in reality it is a racial poem disguised as an unassuming sonnet. It focuses on the safety of darkness and the anxiety that comes from lightness. It says that everything comes from darkness, which can be seen as a racial metaphor.

== Themes ==
The poems in Fifty Years and Other Poems have themes of both racial and nonracial contexts. Johnson has poems that focus on the Black insurrection and racial inequalities and cruelties, while also having poems focusing on the beauty of the world. He has poems of mixed themes because he is appealing to both a Black and white audience. Johnson's poems were written to show a white audience the truth of African American life in a way that felt comfortable to them, while also helping to put the feelings of being an African American into words for his Black audience. Johnson appealed to his white audience through poems of inspirational uplifts, imitations of fin-de-siècle postures, and European style love poetry, but also had poems with a sharper edge to point out injustices and incorporating a genteel style of writing that masked more revolutionary ideas. One of the most uncommon parts of Fifty Years and Other Poems is that some of the poems were protests and calls for social justice which was uncommon in postbellum African American poetry.

== Critical reception ==
There is not much critical reception for Fifty Years and Other Poems as its success was largely dwarfed by the success of Johnson's later works. Also, it has not been republished in recent years so it is hard to come by. In the introduction, Matthews raves of "Fifty Years" saying it is "one of the noblest commemorative poems yet written by any American". However, Benjamin Brawley says Johnson's "Mother Night", "O Black and Unknown Bards", "The White Witch", and "The Young Warrior" are of finer poetic quality. He respectively calls them "a sonnet well rounded out", "strong first and last stanzas", "delicate and difficult theme" with "strong stanzas" and "a poem of rugged strength". Brawley claims Johnson's best poems are the ones that are simple, to the point, and have impactful imagery.
