= James Weldon Johnson =

American writer and activist (1871–1938)

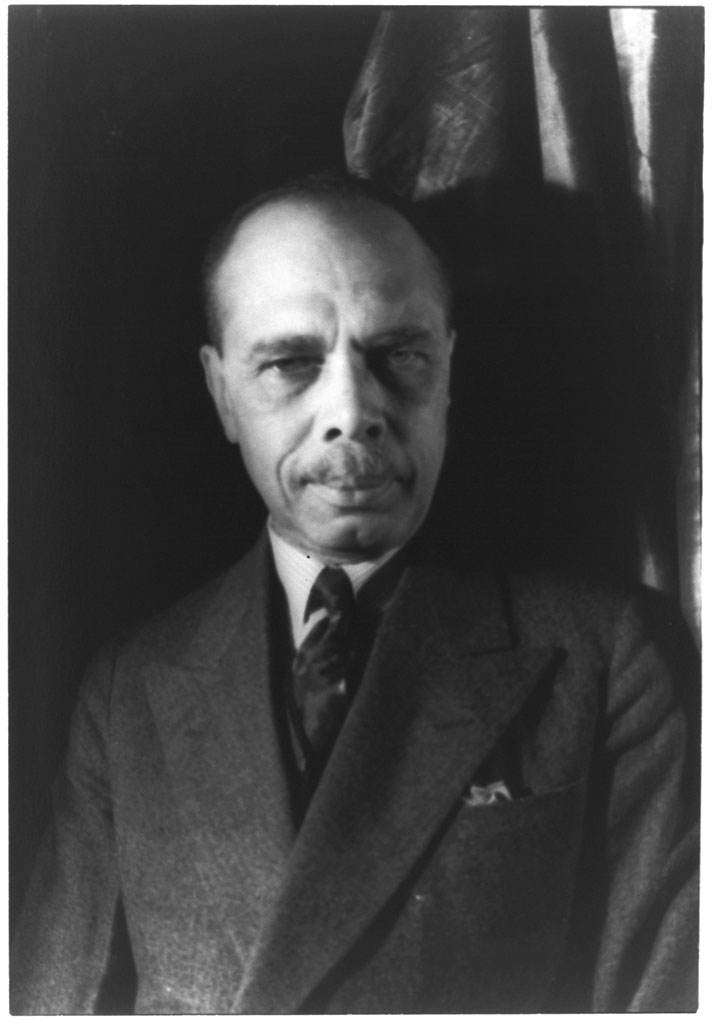
- Photographed by Carl Van Vechten, 1932

Executive Secretary of the NAACP
- In office 1920–1929
- Preceded by: John Shillady
- Succeeded by: Walter White
- In office 1917–1918
- Preceded by: Royal Freeman Nash
- Succeeded by: John Shillady

Personal details
- Born: June 17, 1871 Jacksonville, Florida, U.S.
- Died: June 26, 1938 (aged 67) Wiscasset, Maine, U.S.
- Resting place: Green-Wood Cemetery
- Party: Republican
- Spouse: Grace Nail (m. 1910)
- Relatives: J. Rosamond Johnson (brother); Stephen Dillet (maternal grandfather)
- Education: Atlanta University (BA)
- Awards: Spingarn Medal
- Writing career
- Period: Harlem Renaissance (1891–1938)
- Subject: Civil rights
- Notable works: "Lift Ev'ry Voice and Sing" (1900); The Autobiography of an Ex-Colored Man (1912); God's Trombones (1927)

James Weldon Johnson (June 17, 1871 – June 26, 1938) was an African American author, politician, diplomat, critic, journalist, poet, anthologist, educator, lawyer, songwriter and early civil rights activist. He was married to civil rights activist Grace Nail Johnson.

Johnson was a leader of the National Association for the Advancement of Colored People (NAACP), where he started working in 1917. In 1920, he was chosen as executive secretary of the organization, effectively the operating officer. He served in that position from 1920 to 1930.

Johnson established his reputation as a writer through his poems and anthologies of the poetry and spirituals of Black culture. He wrote the lyrics for "Lift Every Voice and Sing", which later became known as the Black National Anthem, the music being written by his younger brother, composer J. Rosamond Johnson.

In 1934, he was the first African American professor to be hired at New York University. Later in life, he was a professor of creative literature and writing at Fisk University, a historically Black university. In recognition of his scholarship and impact, New York University established the James Weldon Johnson Professorship in 2020.

== Early life and education ==
Johnson was born in 1871 in Jacksonville, Florida, the son of James Johnson, a biracial preacher and headwaiter at the St. James Hotel, a luxury establishment built when Jacksonville was one of Florida's first winter resort destinations, and Helen Louise Dillet, a musician and the first African American female teacher in Florida.

Johnson's father was born in Richmond, Virginia in 1829 and his mother was an emigre from The Bahamas. His maternal great-grandmother, Hester Argo, had escaped from Saint-Domingue (today Haiti) during the revolutionary upheaval in 1802, along with her three young children, including James' grandfather Stephen Dillet (1797–1880). Although originally headed to Cuba, their boat was intercepted by privateers and they were taken to Nassau, where they settled permanently. In 1833, Stephen Dillet became the first man of color to win election to the Bahamian legislature.

The achievements of his father inspired young James to pursue a professional career. James and his brother John Rosamond Johnson were first educated by their mother before attending Edwin Stanton School, where their mother taught. She encouraged both her children to study English literature and the European musical tradition.

After completing the eighth grade at the Stanton School he entered the preparatory school and later the college division of Atlanta University (now, Clark Atlanta University), the first historically Black university ("HBCU") to confer graduate degrees to African Americans. Molded by the classical education for which Atlanta University was known, Johnson regarded his academic training as a trust and knew he was expected to devote himself to helping Black people advance. While attending Atlanta University, Johnson became known as an influential campus speaker, winning the Quiz Club Contest in English Composition and Oratory in 1892.

In the summer of 1891, following his freshman year at Atlanta University, Johnson went to a rural district in Georgia to teach the descendants of former slaves. "In all of my experience there has been no period so brief that has meant so much in my education for life as the three months I spent in the backwoods of Georgia," Johnson wrote. "I was thrown for the first time on my own resources and abilities."

Johnson graduated from Atlanta University with a Bachelor's degree, with honors, in 1894. After graduation, Johnson returned to Jacksonville, where he became Principal of the Stanton School. Paid less than half what white colleagues earned in separate white schools, Johnson added the ninth and tenth grades to the school to extend the years of schooling. He later resigned from this job to pursue other goals.

Johnson obtained his Master's degree from Atlanta University in 1904, after taking graduate courses at Columbia University sometime in the 1900s. Johnson later became a prominent member of the Phi Beta Sigma fraternity, established in 1914 to serve the interests of both students at HBCUs and members of the African American community, in the United States and abroad.

== Entry into public life in Jacksonville ==
After graduating from Atlanta University Johnson founded and edited the Daily American, a newspaper committed to reporting on matters relevant to African Americans, including the wave of Jim Crow laws disenfranchising Black voters and imposing racial segregation throughout society, while promoting the self-help philosophy that Booker T. Washington advocated. The newspaper failed after a year of publication.

While working as a teacher, Johnson also read the law to prepare for the bar, with the aid of white Jacksonville lawyer Thomas A. Ledwith. In 1897, he was the first African American admitted to the Florida Bar since the Reconstruction era ended, and the first ever to be admitted to the Florida Bar through open examination in a Florida state court. He was also the first Black person in Duval County to seek admission to the state bar. In order to be accepted, Johnson had an "unusually stringent" two-hour oral examination before three attorneys and a judge (all white), in a crowded courtroom. He later recalled that one of the examiners, not wanting to see a Black man admitted, left the room, calling him a slur as he "stalked" out. Johnson drew on his law background, especially during his years as a civil rights activist and leading the NAACP, even though he never practiced.

In 1901 he became President of the Colored Florida Teachers’ Association (later known as the Florida State Teachers Association).

== Musical works ==
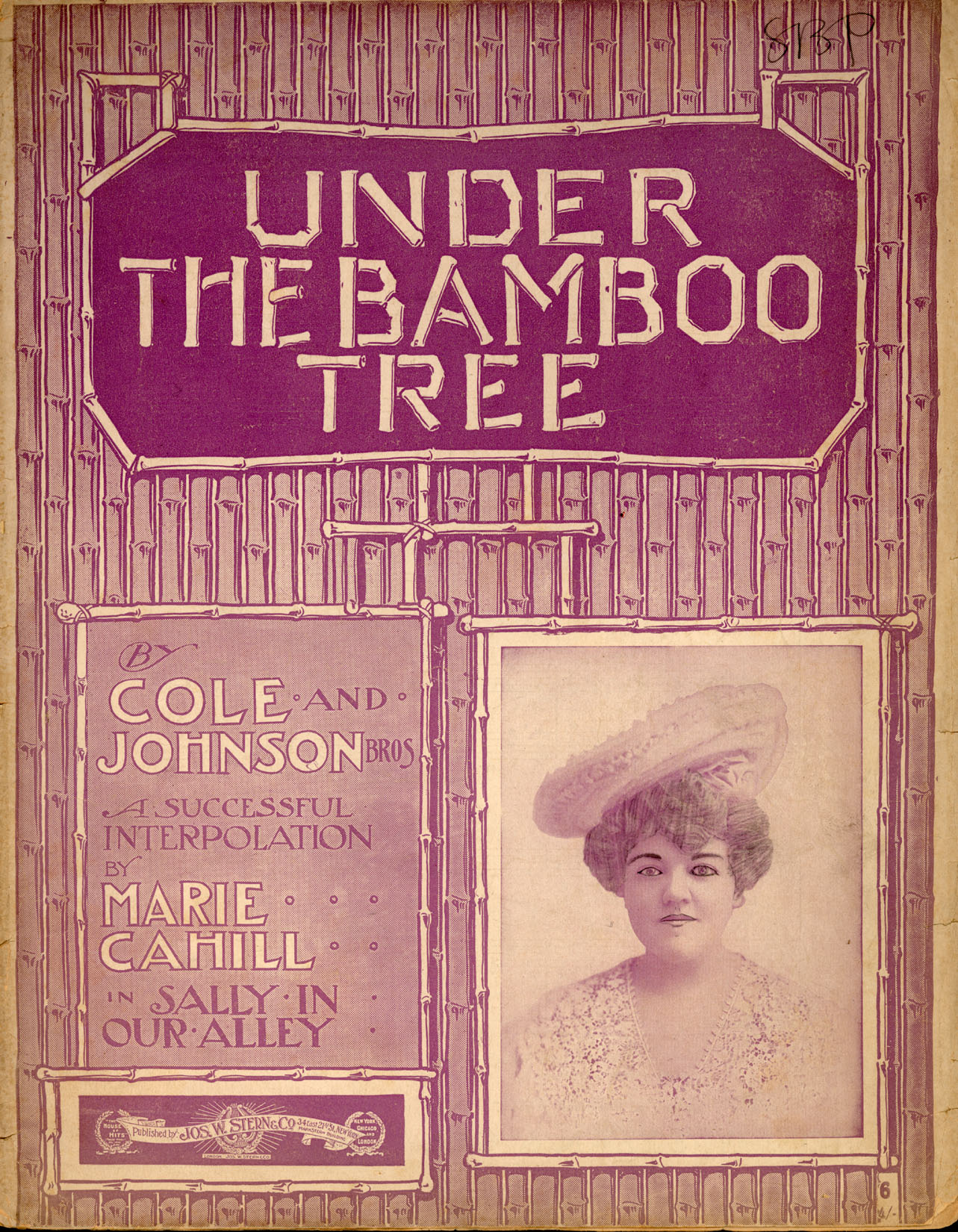
Famously performed in the film Meet Me in St. Louis (1944), the song "Under the Bamboo Tree" was written by the Johnson brothers and Bob Cole for the Broadway show Sally in Our Alley (1902)

In 1899 Johnson and his brother Rosamond spent the summer in New York City, where they sold their first popular song, "Louisiana Lize," which the publisher promoted as "A Genuine Southern Inspiration of Melody and Sentiment." As one historian of Black musical theater has noted, this tune represented a shift in how African Americans were portrayed in popular songs, leaving behind the watermelons, razors and "hot mamas" that "coon songs" of the era featured.

In 1902, Johnson resigned his position as principal of Stanton School and he and his brother moved to New York City to join Bob Cole, a young songwriter they had met while in New York several years earlier. The trio became the successful Broadway musical theater songwriting team of Cole and the Johnson Brothers. Over the next few years, Johnson was largely responsible for the lyrics of roughly 200 songs, including such hits as "Nobody's Lookin' but de Owl and de Moon" (1901), "Under the Bamboo Tree" (1902), "Congo Love Song" (1903), and the spiritual "Dem Bones", for which Johnson wrote the lyrics and his brother the music.

The Johnson Brothers also collaborated on "Lift Ev'ry Voice and Sing". Johnson composed the words as a poem to honor Booker T. Washington, who was visiting Stanton School when the poem was recited by 500 school children to mark Abraham Lincoln's birthday in 1900. This song became widely popular and has become known as the "Negro National Anthem", a title that the NAACP adopted and promoted. The song includes the following lines:

Lift ev'ry voice and sing, 'Til earth and heaven ring,
Ring with the harmonies of liberty;
Let our rejoicing rise, high as the list'ning skies,
Let it resound loud as the rolling sea.
Sing a song full of faith that the dark past has taught us,
Sing a song full of the hope that the present has brought us;
Facing the rising sun of our new day begun,
Let us march on 'til victory is won.

His brother added music to James' words in 1905.

"Lift Ev'ry Voice and Sing" has influenced other artistic works, inspiring art such as Gwendolyn Ann Magee's quilted mosaics. "Lift Ev'ry Voice and Sing" contrasted with W. E. B. Du Bois's exploration in Souls of Black Folk of the fears of post-emancipation generations of African Americans.

Johnson also collaborated on the opera Tolosa with his brother, who wrote the music; it satirized the U.S. annexation of the Pacific islands. Thanks to his success as a Broadway songwriter, Johnson moved in the upper echelons of African-American society in Manhattan and Brooklyn.

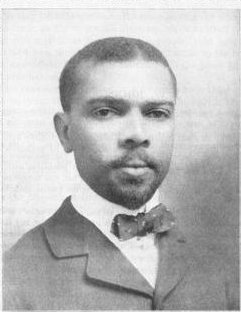
Aged around 30 at the time of this photo, Johnson had already written "Lift Ev'ry Voice and Sing" and been admitted to the Florida bar.

== Political and diplomatic career ==
In 1904 Johnson accepted a position as the treasurer of the Colored Republican Club, started by Charles W. Anderson. A year later he was elected as president of the club. He organized political rallies, working in Theodore Roosevelt's successful presidential campaign, writing two songs for it.

After Roosevelt's election he appointed Johnson in 1906 as United States consul at Puerto Cabello, Venezuela. In 1909, he transferred to Corinto, Nicaragua, where he served from 1909 to 1913. During his stay at Corinto, a rebellion erupted against President Adolfo Diaz. Johnson proved an effective diplomat in such times of strain.

His consular positions also provided him the time and stimulation to pursue his literary career. He wrote substantial portions of his novel, The Autobiography of an Ex-Colored Man, the story of a musician who rejects his Black roots for a life of material comfort in the white world, and his poetry collection, Fifty Years, during this period. His poetry was published in major journals such as The Century Magazine and in The Independent.

== Journalism and criticism ==
In 1914, after his return to the United States, Johnson became editor of the editorial page of The New York Age, an influential African-American weekly newspaper based in New York City. In the early 20th century, it had supported Booker T. Washington's position for racial advancement by industrious work within the Black community, against the arguments of W. E. B. Du Bois for development of a "talented tenth" and political activism to challenge white supremacy. Johnson spelled out in a column in The Age in 1914 what he saw as the mission of the Black press:

Negro weeklies make no pretense at being newspapers in the strict sense of the term. They have a more important mission than the dissemination of mere news. . . . They are race papers. They are organs of propaganda.

Johnson's work on The Age found an even wider audience when W.E.B. DuBois reprinted Johnson's critique of D.W. Griffith's The Birth of a Nation in the NAACP's publication The Crisis. Johnson also used his position at The New York Age to publish his poetry and those of others, such as Claude McKay, who would be at the center of the Harlem Renaissance of the 1920s.

== Years with the NAACP ==
=== Organizational work ===
In 1916 Johnson started working as a field secretary and organizer for the National Association for the Advancement of Colored People (NAACP), which had been founded in 1910. In this role, he built and revived local chapters. At the same time, in opposing race riots in Northern cities and the lynchings frequent in the South during and immediately after the end of World War I, Johnson engaged the NAACP in mass demonstrations.

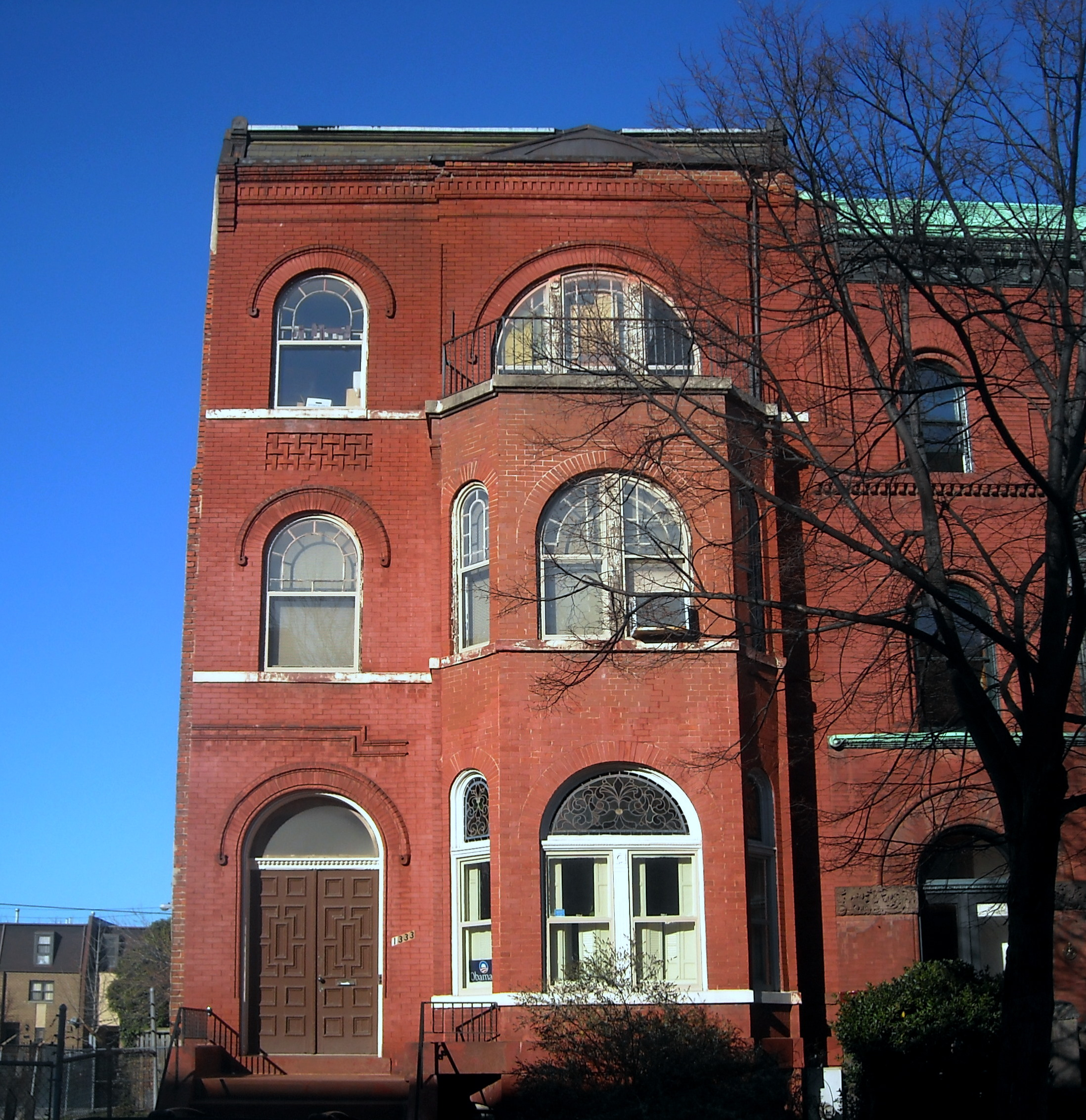
Johnson lived here in the Logan Circle neighborhood of Washington, D.C., while serving as national organizer for the National Association for the Advancement of Colored People (NAACP).

Appointed in 1920 as the first Black executive secretary of the NAACP, Johnson helped increase membership and extended the movement's reach by organizing numerous new chapters in the South. He served in this role, as effectively the chief operating officer, through 1930. During this period, the NAACP was mounting frequent legal challenges to the Southern states' disenfranchisement of African Americans, which had been established at the turn of the century by such legal devices as poll taxes, literacy tests, and white primaries.

=== Campaign against lynching and racial violence ===
Lynching, which had murdered thousands of African-Americans in the aftermath of the American Civil War, continued into the new century. Johnson engaged the NAACP in mass demonstrations to demand an end to it, organizing a silent protest parade of more than 10,000 African Americans down New York City's Fifth Avenue on July 28, 1917, the largest protest organized by African Americans to that point, to protest the continued lynching of Black people in the South.

Johnson traveled to Memphis, Tennessee in 1917 to investigate a brutal lynching that was witnessed by thousands. His report on the carnival-like atmosphere surrounding the burning-to-death of Ell Persons was published nationally as a supplement to the July 1917 issue of the NAACP's Crisis magazine, and during his visit there he chartered the Memphis chapter of the NAACP.

Racial violence exploded nationwide after veterans returned from the First World War and encountered competition for housing and jobs. In 1919, Johnson coined the term "Red Summer" and organized peaceful protests against the white racial violence against Black people that broke out that year in numerous industrial cities of the North and Midwest.

Johnson was a speaker at the 1919 National Conference on Lynching and lobbied for the Dyer Anti-Lynching Bill of 1921, which was passed easily by the House, but repeatedly defeated by the white Southern bloc in the Senate.

=== Investigation of the U.S. occupation of Haiti ===
Johnson traveled to Haiti to investigate conditions on the island, which had been occupied by U.S. Marines since 1915, ostensibly because of political unrest. Following this trip, Johnson published a series of articles in The Nation in 1920 in which he described the American occupation as brutal. He offered suggestions for the economic and social development of Haiti. These articles were later collected and reprinted as a book under the title Self-Determining Haiti.

His 1920 report about "the economic corruption, forced labor, press censorship, racial segregation and wanton violence introduced to Haiti by the U.S. occupation encouraged numerous African Americans to flood the State Department and the offices of Republican Party officials with letters" calling for an end to the abuses and to remove troops. The United States finally ended its occupation of Haiti in 1934, 16 years after any threat from Germany had been ended by its defeat in the First World War.

== Literary work ==
Johnson's first success as a writer was the poem "Lift Ev'ry Voice and Sing" (1899), which his brother Rosamond later set to music; the song became unofficially known as the "Negro National Anthem". During his time in the diplomatic service, Johnson completed what became his best-known book, The Autobiography of an Ex-Colored Man, which he published anonymously in 1912. He chose anonymity to avoid any controversy that might endanger his diplomatic career.

That novel explores issues of racial identity and “passing” in the twentieth century, a common theme for the writers of the 1920s. It was not until 1927 that Johnson acknowledged writing the novel, stressing that it was not a work of autobiography but mostly fictional.

In this period, he also published his first poetry collection, Fifty Years and Other Poems (1917). It showed his increasing politicization and adoption of the Black vernacular influences that characterize his later work.

Johnson returned to New York, where he was involved in the Harlem Renaissance of the 1920s. He had a broad appreciation for Black artists, musicians and writers, and worked to heighten awareness in the wider society of their creativity. In 1922, he published a landmark anthology The Book of American Negro Poetry, with a "Preface" that celebrated the power of Black expressive culture. He compiled and edited the anthology The Book of American Negro Spirituals, which was published in 1925.

He continued to publish his own poetry as well. Johnson's collection God's Trombones: Seven Negro Sermons in Verse (1927) is considered most important. He demonstrated that Black folk life could be the material of serious poetry. He also comments on the violence of racism in poems such as "Fragment", which portrays slavery as against both God's love and God's law.

Following the flourishing of the Harlem Renaissance in the 1920s, Johnson reissued his anthology of poetry by Black writers, The Book of American Negro Poetry, in 1931, including many new poets. This established the African-American poetic tradition for a much wider audience and also inspired younger poets.

In 1930, he published a sociological study, Black Manhattan (1930), which was financed by a fellowship from the Rosenwald Fund. His Negro Americans, What Now? (1934) was a book-length address advocating fuller civil rights for African Americans. By this time, tens of thousands of African Americans had left the South for Northern and Midwestern cities in the Great Migration, but the majority still lived in the South. There they were politically disenfranchised and subject to Jim Crow laws and white supremacy. Outside the South, many faced discrimination but had more political rights and chances for education and work.

In 1933, he published his autobiography Along This Way.

Throughout the 1920s, Johnson supported and promoted the Harlem Renaissance, trying to help young Black authors to get published. Johnson also assisted playwright Annie Nathan Meyer in crafting the Broadway play Black Souls (1924) by editing the work for authenticity of language. The work is credited as "one of the earliest known 'lynching dramas' written by a white woman.

Shortly before his death in 1938, Johnson supported efforts by Ignatz Waghalter, a Polish-Jewish composer who had escaped the Nazis, to establish a classical orchestra of African-American musicians.

== Academic career ==
In 1930, at the age of 59, Johnson returned to education after his many years leading the NAACP when he accepted the Spence Chair of Creative Literature at Fisk University in Nashville, Tennessee. The university created the position for him in recognition of his achievements as a poet, editor and critic during the Harlem Renaissance. In addition to discussing literature, he lectured on a wide range of issues related to the lives and civil rights of Black Americans. He held this position until his death. In 1934, he also was appointed as the first African-American professor at New York University, where he taught several classes in literature and culture.

== Film ==
At least one of Mr. Johnson's works was credited as leading to a movie. Go Down, Death! was a Harlemwood Studios production, directed by Spencer Williams. In the film credits, it states, "Alfred N. Sack Reverently Presents...." (the film), with hymns playing in the background. The film opens:

"Forward: This Story of Love and Simple Faith and Triumph of Good Over Evil was inspired by the Poem "GO DOWN, DEATH!" from the Pen of the Celebrated Negro Author James Weldon Johnson, Now of Sainted Memory."

The film featured an all African-American cast, including Myra D. Hemings, Samuel H. James, Eddie L. Houston, Spencer Williams and Amos Droughan, among others. It also included a dancing and band sequence, depicting a fun-looking, middle-class oriented club with drinks and gambling, as its opening backdrop.

== Personal life and death ==
In 1910, Johnson married Grace Nail, whom he had met in New York City several years earlier while he was working as a songwriter. A cultured, well-educated New Yorker, Grace Nail Johnson later collaborated with her husband on a screenwriting project.

Johnson died in 1938 while vacationing in Wiscasset, Maine, when the car his wife was driving was hit by a train. His funeral in Harlem was attended by more than 1,000 people. Johnson's ashes are interred at Green-Wood Cemetery in Brooklyn, New York.

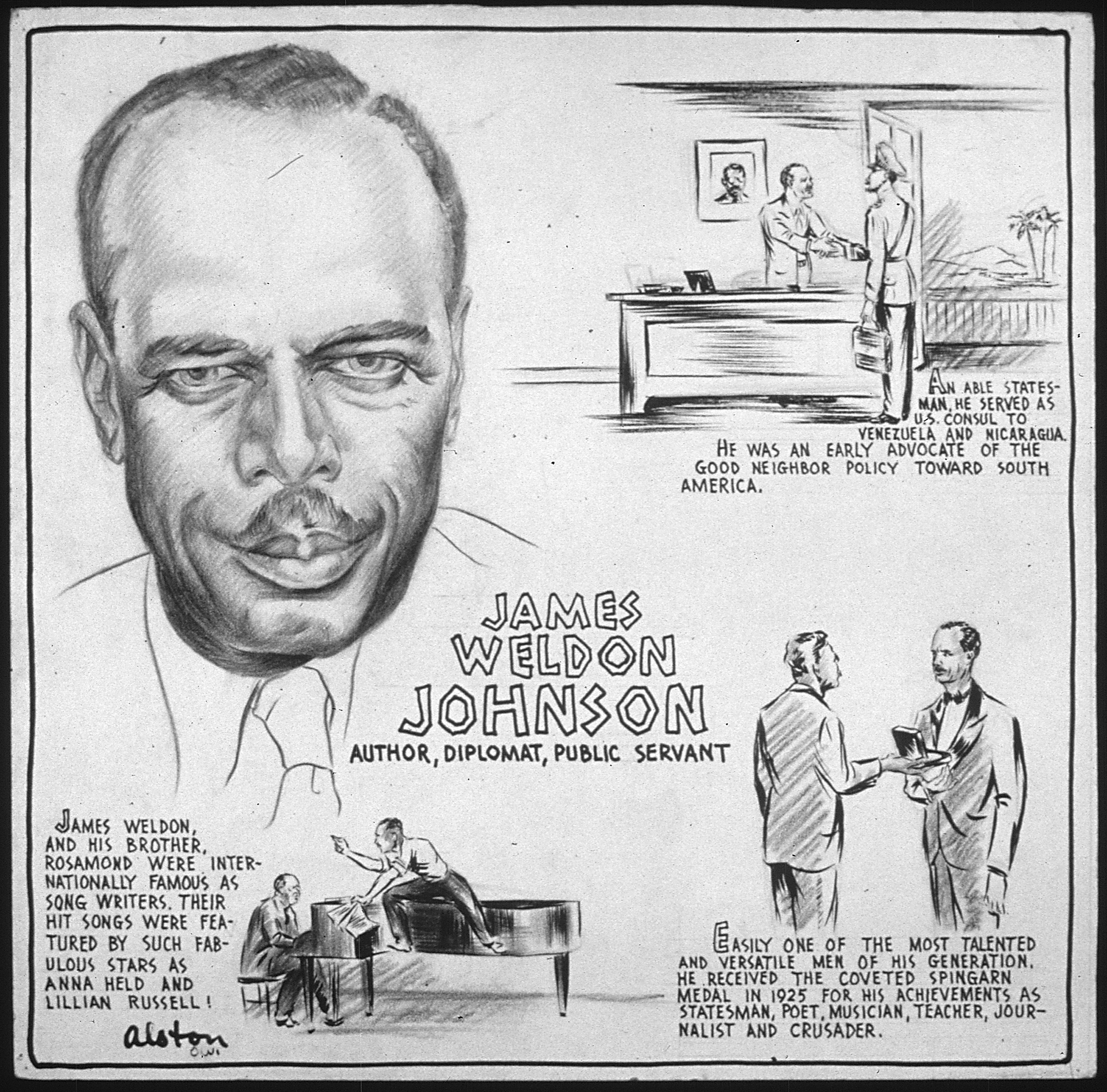
Illustration of James Weldon Johnson by Charles Henry Alston

== Legacy and honors ==
- 1904: Honorary master's degree from Atlanta University.
- 1925: Spingarn Medal from the NAACP for outstanding achievement by an American Negro.
- 1928: Harmon Gold Award for God's Trombones: Seven Negro Sermons in Verse (1927).
- 1929: Julius Rosenwald Fund Grant.
- 1933: W. E. B. Du Bois Prize for Negro Literature.
- Honorary doctorates from Talladega College (1917) and Howard University (1923).
- 2007: Emory University in Atlanta established the James Weldon Johnson Institute for Advanced Interdisciplinary Studies in his honor, later renamed the James Weldon Johnson Institute for the Study of Race and Difference.
- The James Weldon Johnson building at Coppin State University in Baltimore, Maryland, is named in his honor.

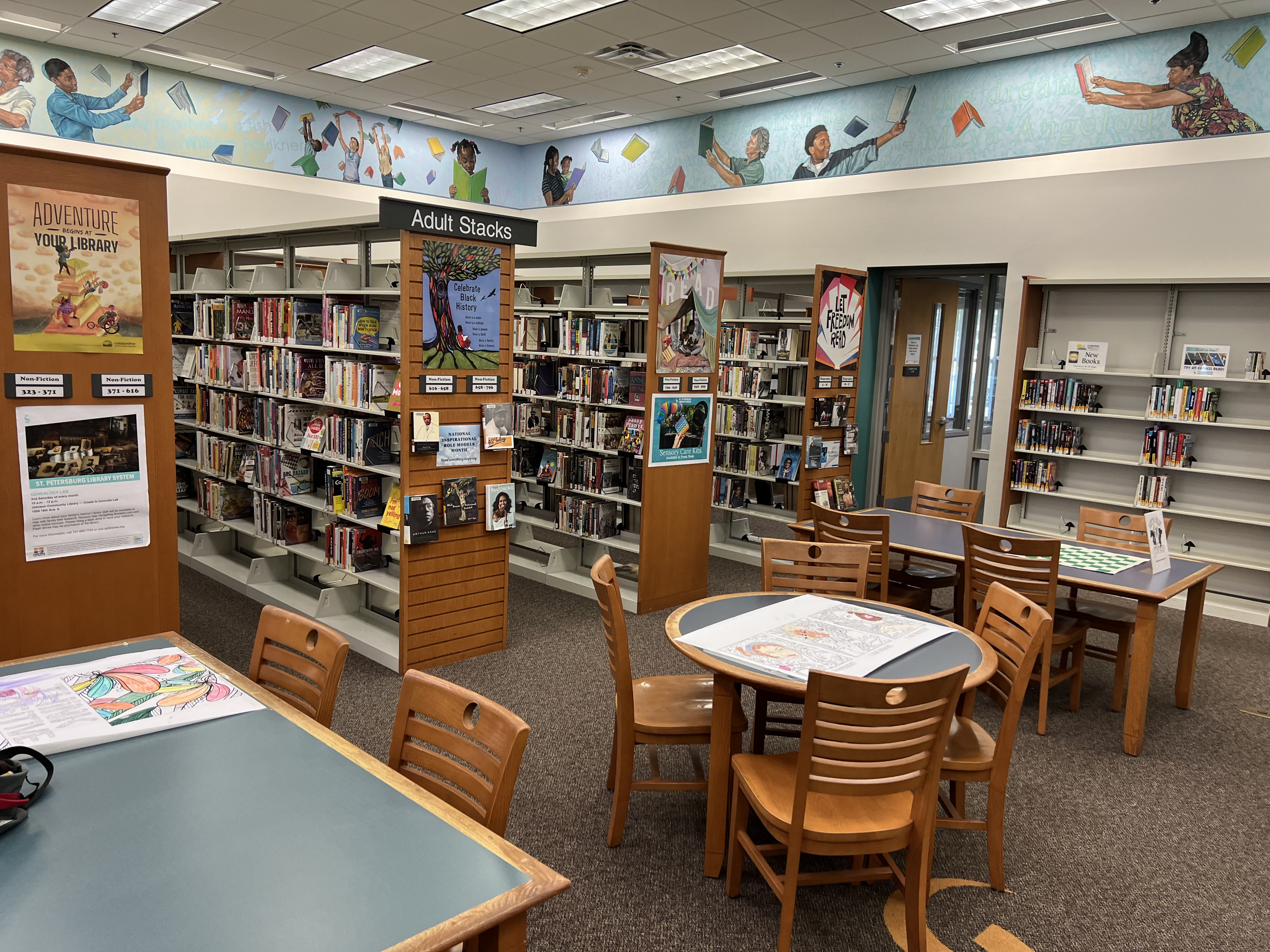
James Weldon Johnson Library in South St. Petersburg, Florida, interior, November 13, 2024

- The James Weldon Johnson Middle School in Jacksonville, Florida, the city of his birth, is named in his honor.
- The James Weldon Johnson Community Library in St. Petersburg, Florida, is named in his honor and to commemorate his birth in nearby Jacksonville.
- On February 2, 1988, the United States Postal Service issued a 22-cent postage stamp in his honor.
- On August 11, 2020, the Jacksonville, Florida City Council renamed Hemming Park to James Weldon Johnson Park.
- In 2021, the Maine Legislature designated June 17 James Weldon Johnson Annual Observance Day. The bill also created a task force of civil society organizations and Wiscasset residents to "develop methods to educate the public on James Weldon Johnson's life and legacy in order to continue his work to end systemic racism."

== Books ==
=== Poetry ===
- Fifty Years and Other Poems (1917)
- God's Trombones: Seven Negro Sermons in Verse (1927)
- Saint Peter Relates an Incident: Selected Poems (1935)

=== Anthologies ===
- The Book of American Negro Poetry (1922, editor), anthology (Link via HathiTrust)
- The Book of Negro Spirituals (1925, editor), anthology
- The Second Book of Negro Spirituals (1926, editor)

=== Other works ===
- The Autobiography of an Ex-Colored Man (1912/1927, novel)
- Black Manhattan (1930, study)
- Negro Americans, What Now? (1934, essay)
- Johnson, James Weldon (1968) [1933]. Along This Way: The Autobiography of James Weldon Johnson (Viking Compass ed.). New York: Viking Press.

== See also ==
- African American musical theater
- Harlem Renaissance
- Red Summer of 1919
- List of first minority male lawyers and judges in Florida
- List of people from Harlem
