= Weeping Willow (rag) =

1903 ragtime composition by Scott Joplin

- by Scott Joplin
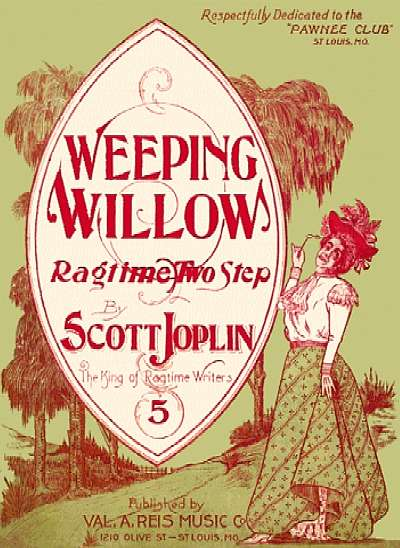
- Front cover of the 1903 sheet music
- Genre: Ragtime
- Form: Rag
- Published: 1903
- Publisher: Val A. Reis Music Co
- Instrument: Piano Solo

"Weeping Willow" is a 1903 classic piano ragtime composition by Scott Joplin. It was one of Joplin's simpler and less famous ragtime scores, written during a transitional period in his life, and one of the few pieces that Joplin cut as a piano roll in a 1916 session.

== Music ==
"Weeping Willow" is sub-titled "A rag time two step", which was a form of dance popular until about 1911, and a common style among rags written at the time.

Its structure is: Intro A A B B A C C D D

The A and B sections are in the key of G major very lofty and highly melodic. The "B" section makes good use of alternating patterns creating interesting melodic shifts. The Trio ("C" section) is in the key of C major; its chord progression was popular in black folk songs, and was used in Eddie Miller's Tain't Nobody's Bizness If I Do. The D section emphasizes another fine melody, and accentuates the variety found between sections.

== Publication history ==
Joplin's recent scuffle with John Stillwell Stark over the publication of The Ragtime Dance created a level of animosity between composer and publisher. Weeping Willow became the second of many pieces published by a firm other than Stark's since Maple Leaf Rag.

The copyright was registered June 6, 1903, and sheet music was published by the Val A. Reis Music Company of St. Louis. The piece was also released on Connorized piano rolls.

== See also ==
- List of compositions by Scott Joplin
