= List of compositions by Scott Joplin =

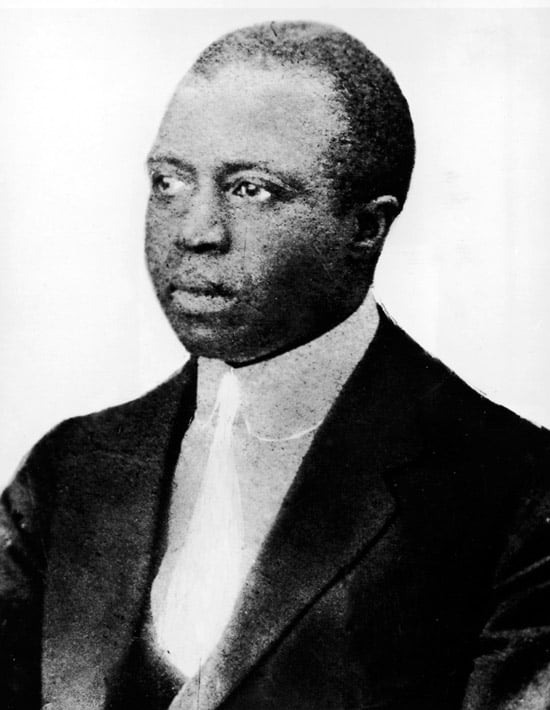
Joplin in 1912

This is a complete list of compositions by Scott Joplin (November 24, 1868 – April 1, 1917), an American composer and pianist dubbed "The King of Ragtime."

Born in Arkansas just outside Texarkana, Joplin was a street performer before settling in Sedalia, Missouri; St. Louis, Missouri; and finally New York City, where he died in 1917. He wrote more than 40 original ragtime pieces, one ragtime ballet, and two operas. One of his first pieces, the "Maple Leaf Rag" (1899), has been recognized as the archetypal rag; its rhythmic patterns, melody lines, and harmony influenced subsequent rag composers.

Most of Joplin's works were published by John Stark of Sedalia, although he did use other lesser-known companies, including his own "Scott Joplin Music Publishing Company." The "Maple Leaf Rag" brought him steady income, but his finances remained precarious throughout his career. His first opera, A Guest of Honor, was lost after an unsuccessful tour in 1903. After the 1953 death of his widow, Lottie, a number of manuscripts of unpublished work were lost and no copies of them are known to exist.

When Joplin was learning the piano, serious musical circles condemned ragtime because of its association with the vulgar and inane songs of Tin Pan Alley. As a composer, Joplin refined ragtime, developing it from the dance music played by pianists in brothels in cities like St. Louis. This new art form, the classic rag, combined Afro-American folk music's syncopation and nineteenth-century European romanticism, with its harmonic schemes and its march-like tempos, in particular the works of John Philip Sousa. With this as a foundation, Joplin intended his compositions to be played exactly as he wrote them – without improvisation. Joplin wrote his rags as "classical" music to raise ragtime above its "cheap bordello" origins and produced work which opera historian Elise Kirk described as "...more tuneful, contrapuntal, infectious, and harmonically colorful than any others of his era."

Many inconsistencies can be found among Joplin's own titles, his subtitles, and titles printed on the covers of sheet music. For the editor of the collected works this reveals publishers' "editorial casualness" as well as a view that dance-steps in the genre could be interchangeable. Many of the works cannot be dated with certainty, and the pieces were not always submitted for copyright registration. In many cases the publication date is the only suggestion of when a piece was composed.

== List ==
Title	Genre	Year	Form	Keys	Notes/Samples	Reference
Please Say You Will	Song	1895	Intro Vs1 Ch Intro Vs2 Ch Intro Vs3 Ch	B♭	Lyrics by Scott Joplin.	
A Picture of Her Face	Song	1895	Intro Vs1 Ch Coda Vs2 Ch Coda	F	Lyrics by Scott Joplin. Scott Joplin - A Picture of Her Face (1895)	
Great Crush Collision March	March	1896	Intro AA BB CC DD E D2 E D2	Dm/F/F/B♭...	Scott Joplin - The Great Crush Collision March (1896)	
Combination March	March	1896	Intro AA Trans. BB Trans. CC DD	B♭/B♭/E♭/E♭	Scott Joplin - Combination March (1896)	
Harmony Club Waltz	Waltz	1896	Intro AA BB CC DD EE FF GG A B	B♭/B♭/Gm/B♭/G/C/F/B♭/B♭	Scott Joplin - Harmony Club Waltz (1896)	
Original Rags	Rag	1899	Intro AA BB CC A♭br.Intro A DD EE	G/G/C/G/D/G	Arranged by Charles N. Daniels, although this involvement is disputed. Scott Joplin - Original Rags (1899)	
Maple Leaf Rag	Rag	1899	AA BB A CC DD	A♭/A♭/A♭/D♭/A♭	Scott Joplin - Maple Leaf Rag (1899)	
Swipesy Cakewalk	Cakewalk	1900	Intro AA BB A CC DD	B♭/B♭/B♭/E♭/B♭	Composed in collaboration with Arthur Marshall. Scott Joplin - Swipesy Cakewalk (1900)	
Peacherine Rag	Rag	1901	Intro AA BB A CC DD	E♭/B♭/E♭/A♭/A♭	Scott Joplin - Peacherine Rag (1901)	
Sunflower Slow Drag	Slow Drag	1901	Intro AA BB A Trans. CC DD	B♭/B♭/B♭/E♭/E♭	Composed in collaboration with Scott Hayden. Scott Joplin - Sunflower Slow Drag (1901) With Scott Hayden	
Augustan Club Waltz	Waltz	1901	Intro AA BB CC DD Coda	B♭/B♭/Gm/B♭	Scott Joplin - Augustan Club Waltz (1901)	
I Am Thinking of My Pickaninny Days	Song	1901	Intro Vs1 Ch Vs2 Ch	B♭	Music by Joplin; lyrics by Henry Jackson. Scott Joplin - I Am Thinking Of My Pickaninny Days (1902)	
The Easy Winners	Syncopated Two Step	1901	Intro AA BB A Trans. CC DD	A♭/A♭/A♭/D♭/D♭	Scott Joplin - Easy Winners (1901)	
A Blizzard	Unknown	1901	Unknown.	Unknown.	Lost – unpublished. Mentioned in Indianapolis Freeman, November 16, 1901.	
Cleopha	March and Two Step	1902	Intro AA BB A CC DD	F/F/F/B♭/B♭	Scott Joplin - Cleopha (1902)	
A Breeze From Alabama	March and Two Step	1902	Intro AA BB CC Trans. DD Trans. BB	C/C/A♭/F/C	Scott Joplin - A Breeze From Alabama (1902)	
Elite Syncopations	Rag	1902	Intro AA BB A CC DD	F/F/F/B♭/B♭	Scott Joplin - Elite Syncopations (1902)	
The Entertainer	Syncopated Two Step	1902	Intro AA BB A CC Trans. DD	C/C/C/F/C	Scott Joplin - The Entertainer (1902)	
March Majestic	March and Two Step	1902	Intro AA BB CC D C D C	G/G/C...	Scott Joplin - March Majestic (1902)	
The Strenuous Life	Syncopated Two Step	1902	Intro AA BB A Trans. CC DD	C/G/C/F/F	Scott Joplin - The Strenuous Life (1902)	
The Ragtime Dance	Song	1902	Intro A B CC Trans. DD EE [FF GG HH GG]	B♭/Gm/B♭/E♭...	Lyrics by Scott Joplin. Scott Joplin - Ragtime Dance (1906)	
Something Doing	Syncopated Two Step	1903	Intro AA BB A CC DD	F/F/F/B♭/B♭	Composed in collaboration with Scott Hayden. Scott Joplin - Something Doing (1903)	
Weeping Willow	Syncopated Two Step	1903	Intro AA BB A CC DD	G/G/G/C/C	Scott Joplin - Weeping Willow Rag (1903)	
Little Black Baby	Song	1903	Intro Vs1 Ch1 Vs2 Ch2	B♭	Music by Joplin; lyrics by Louise Armstrong Bristol. Scott Joplin - Little Black Baby (1903)	
Palm Leaf Rag	Rag	1903	Intro AA BB CC Trans. AA	B♭/B♭/E♭/B♭	Scott Joplin - Palm Leaf Rag (1903)	
A Guest of Honor	Opera	1903	2 acts	Unknown.	Lost.	
Dude's Parade	Opera Excerpt	1903	Unknown.	Unknown.	Lost – unpublished. Excerpt from A Guest of Honor. Announced in the Indianapolis Freeman, September 12, 1903.	
Patriotic Patrol	Opera Excerpt	1903	Unknown.	Unknown.	Lost – unpublished. Excerpt from A Guest of Honor. Announced in the Indianapolis Freeman, September 12, 1903.	
Maple Leaf Rag	Song	1904	Intro Vs1 Ch Int1 Intro Vs2 Ch Int2 Intro Vs3 Ch	E♭	Lyrics by Sydney Brown. A simplified arrangement not produced by Joplin. Scott Joplin and words by Sydney Brown - Maple Leaf Rag Song (1904)	
The Sycamore	Rag	1904	Intro AA BB CC DD	G/G/C/C	Scott Joplin - The Sycamore (1904)	
The Favorite	Syncopated Two Step	1904	Intro AA BB A CC DD	B♭/Gm/B♭/E♭/E♭	Scott Joplin - The Favorite (1904)	
The Cascades	Rag	1904	Intro AA BB Trans. CC DD	C/C/B♭/E♭	Scott Joplin - The Cascades (1904)	
The Chrysanthemum	Intermezzo	1904	Intro AA BB A CC DD C	B♭/F/B♭/E♭/Cm/E♭	Scott Joplin - The Chrysanthemum (1904)	
Bethena	Syncopated Waltz	1905	Intro A Trans. BB Trans. A Trans. CC Trans. DD EE Trans. A Coda	G/B♭/G/F/Bm/D/G	Scott Joplin - Bethena (1905)	
Binks' Waltz	Waltz	1905	Intro AA BB A CC A Coda	B♭/Gm/B♭/E♭/B♭	Scott Joplin - Binks' Waltz (1905)	
Sarah Dear	Song	1905	Intro Vs1 Ch Vs2 Ch	F	Music by Joplin; lyrics by Henry Jackson.	
The Rosebud March	March and Two Step	1905	Intro AA BB CC Trans. AA	G/G/C/G	Scott Joplin - The Rose Bud March (1905)	
Leola	Syncopated Two Step	1905	AA BB A CC DD	A♭/A♭/A♭/D♭/A♭	Scott Joplin - Leola Two Step (1905)	
You Stand Good with Me, Babe	Song	1905	Unknown.	Unknown.	Lost – unpublished. Announced in Indianapolis Freeman, July 22, 1905.	
Eugenia	Rag	1906	Intro AA BB A C D C D C	B♭/B♭/B♭/E♭...	Scott Joplin - Eugenia (1905)	
The Ragtime Dance	Stop-Time Two Step	1906	Intro AA BB CC [DD EE FF]	B♭/E♭...	Scott Joplin - Ragtime Dance (1906)	
Antoinette	March and Two Step	1906	Intro AA BB C D C D C	G/G/C...	Scott Joplin - Antoinette (1906)	
Good-bye Old Gal Good-bye	Song	1906	Intro Vs1 Ch Ch Vs2 Ch Ch	F	Music by H. Carroll Taylor, lyrics by Mac Darden, arranged by Joplin. Mac Darden and H. Carroll Taylor arranged by Scott Joplin - Good-bye Old Gal Good-bye (1906)	
Snoring Sampson: A Quarrel in Ragtime	Song	1907	Intro Vs1 Ch Vs2 Ch	C	Music & lyrics by Harry La Mertha, arranged by Joplin. Harry La Mertha arranged by Scott Joplin - Snoring Sampson (1907)	
The Nonpareil (None To Equal)	Syncopated Two Step	1907	Intro AA BB CC DD	B♭/B♭/E♭/E♭	Scott Joplin - The Nonpareil (1907)	
When Your Hair Is Like The Snow	Song	1907	Intro Vs1 Ch Vs2 Ch	C	Music by Joplin; lyrics by Owen Spendthrift.	
Gladiolus Rag	Rag	1907	AA BB A CC DD	A♭/A♭/A♭/D♭/D♭	Scott Joplin - Gladiolus Rag (1907)	
Searchlight Rag	Rag	1907	Intro AA BB A CC DD	B♭/B♭/B♭/E♭/E♭	Scott Joplin - Searchlight Rag (1907)	
Lily Queen	Syncopated Two Step	1907	Intro AA BB A CC DD	C/C/C/F/F	By Arthur Marshall, edited by Joplin. Scott Joplin - Lily Queen (1907)	
Rose Leaf Rag	Syncopated Two Step	1907	Intro AA BB A CC DD	C/C/C/F/F	Scott Joplin - Rose Leaf Rag (1907)	
Heliotrope Bouquet	Slow Drag	1907	Intro A BB A CC DD	G/G/G/C/C	Composed in collaboration with Louis Chauvin. Scott Joplin - Heliotrope Bouquet (1907)	
Fig Leaf Rag	Rag	1908	Intro AA BB A CC DD	B♭/B♭/B♭/E♭/E♭	Scott Joplin - Fig Leaf Rag (1908)	
Sugar Cane	Syncopated Two Step	1908	AA BB A CC DD	B♭/B♭/B♭/E♭/B♭	Scott Joplin - Sugar Cane Rag (1908)	
Sensation	Rag	1908	AA BB A CC D	G/G/G/C/C	Composed by Joseph F. Lamb, arranged by Joplin. Scott Joplin - Sensation Rag (1908)	
Pine Apple Rag	Rag	1908	Intro AA BB A CC DD	B♭/B♭/B♭/E♭/E♭	Scott Joplin - Pine Apple Rag (1908)	
School of Ragtime – 6 Exercises for Piano	Exercise	1908	AA; BB; CC; DD; EE; FF	C	Scott Joplin - School of Ragtime (1908)	
Pleasant Moments	Syncopated Waltz	1909	Intro A BB A CC A Coda	G/D/G/C/G	Scott Joplin - Pleasant Moments (1909) Performed by the composer on a player piano in 1916	
Wall Street Rag	Rag	1909	Intro AA BB CC DD	C/C/F/F	Scott Joplin - Wall Street Rag (1909)	
Solace	Habanera	1909	Intro AA BB A CC DD	C/C/C/F/F	Scott Joplin - Solace (1909) Computer-generated audio for "Solace"	
Country Club	Syncopated Two Step	1909	Intro AA BB A CC DD	C/C/C/F/F	Scott Joplin - Country Club (1909)	
Euphonic Sounds	Syncopated Novelty	1909	Intro AA BB A CC A Coda	B♭/B♭/B♭/F/B♭	Scott Joplin - Euphonic Sounds (1909)	
Paragon Rag	Rag	1909	Intro AA BB A CC DD	G/G/G/C/C	Scott Joplin - Paragon Rag (1909)	
Stoptime Rag	Stop-Time Two Step	1910	AA BB A CC DD EE D FF GG	C/Am/C...	Scott Joplin - Stop Time Rag (1910)	
Pine Apple Rag	Song	1910	Intro Vs1A Vs1B Ch Vs2A Vs2B Ch	E♭	Lyrics by Joe Snyder. Scott Joplin - Pine Apple Rag (1908)	
Treemonisha	Opera	1911	3 acts, 27 chapters	N/A		
Overature	Operatic Overature	1911	-	-	Scored for orchestra (survives in piano reduction).	
The Bag of Luck	Operatic Quintet	1911	-	-	Scored for Zodzetrick, Monisha, Ned, Treemonisha, and Remus.	
The Corn Huskers	Operatic Chorus	1911	-	-	Scored for Chorus, Treemonisha, and Remus.	
We're Goin' Around (A Ring Play)	Operatic Ensemble	1911	-	-	Scored for Andy, and Chorus.	
The Wreath	Operatic Ensemble	1911	-	-	Scored for Treemonisha, Lucy, Monisha, Chorus.	
The Sacred Tree	Operatic Aria	1911	-	-	Scored for Monisha.	
Surprised	Operatic Ensemble	1911	-	-	Scored for Treemonisha, and Chorus.	
Treemonisha's Bringing Up	Operatic Ensemble	1911	-	-	Scored for Monisha, Treemonisha, and Chorus.	
Good Advice	Operatic Ensemble	1911	-	-	Scored for Parson Alltalk, and Chorus.	
Confusion	Operatic Ensemble	1911	-	-	Scored for Monisha, Chorus, Lucy, Ned, and Remus.	
Superstition	Operatic Ensemble	1911	-	-	Scored for Simon, and Chorus.	
Treemonisha in Peril	Operatic Ensemble	1911	-	-	Scored for Simon, Chorus, Zodzetrick, Luddud, and Cephus.	
Frolic of the Bears	Operatic Ballet	1911	Intro A B1 B2 C Trans. A B1 B2 C Trans. A Coda	-	Scored for Chorus.	
The Wasp Nest	Operatic Ensemble	1911	-	-	Scored for Simon, Chorus, and Cephus.	
The Rescue	Operatic Duet	1911	-	-	Scored for Treemonisha, and Remus.	
We Will Rest Awhile / Song of the Cotton Pickers	Operatic Quartet	1911	-	-	Scored for Chorus.	
Going Home	Operatic Ensemble	1911	-	-	Scored for Treemonisha, Remus, and Chorus.	
Aunt Dinah Has Blowed de Horn	Operatic Chorus	1911	-	-	Scored for Chorus.	
Prelude to Act III	Operatic Prelude	1911	A BB CC A Coda	G/B♭/C/G	Scored for orchestra (survives in piano reduction).	
I Want To See My Child	Operatic Duet	1911	-	-	Scored for Monisha, and Ned.	
Treemonisha's Return	Operatic Ensemble	1911	-	-	Scored for Monisha, Ned, Remus, Treemonisha, Chorus, Andy, Zodzetrick, and Luddud.	
Wrong is Never Right	Operatic Ensemble	1911	-	-	Scored for Remus, and Chorus.	
A♭use	Operatic Ensemble	1911	-	-	Scored for Andy, Chorus, and Treemonisha.	
When Villains Ramble Far and Near (A Lecture)	Operatic Aria	1911	-	-	Scored for Ned.	
Conjurors Forgiven	Operatic Ensemble	1911	-	-	Scored for Treemonisha, Andy, and Chorus.	
We Will Trust You As Our Leader	Operatic Finale	1911	-	-	Scored for Treemonisha, and Chorus.	
A Real Slow Drag	Operatic Syncopated Dance	1911	Intro A B1 B2 Trans. CC B1 B2 Coda	Bm/F/B♭/F	Scored for Treemonisha, Lucy, and Chorus.	
Felicity Rag	Syncopated Two Step	1911	Intro AA BB CC Trans. DD	C/C/C/F/C	Composed in collaboration with Scott Hayden; attributed to circa 1903. Scott Joplin - Felicity Rag (1911)	
Lovin' Babe	Song	1911	Intro Vs1 Ch Vs2 Ch	G	Lyrics by Al. R. Turner, arranged by Joplin.	
Scott Joplin's New Rag	Rag	1912	Intro AA BB A CC Trans. D A Coda	C/Am/C/C/Em/C	Scott Joplin - New Rag (1912)	
Kismet Rag	Rag	1913	Intro AA BB A CC DD	C/G/C/F/C	Composed in collaboration with Scott Hayden; attributed to circa 1903. Scott Joplin - Kismet Rag (1913)	
A Real Slow Drag	Syncopated Dance	1913	Intro A B1 B2 Trans. CC B1 B2 Coda	Bm/F/B♭/F	Revised excerpt from Treemonisha.	
Prelude to Act III	Prelude	1913	A BB CC A Coda	G/B♭/C/G	Revised excerpt from Treemonisha.	
Scott Joplin's New Rag	Rag	1914	Intro AA BB A CC Trans. D A Coda	C/Am/C/C/Em/C	Revised republication.	
The Silver Swan	Rag	1914	Intro AA BB A CC Intro A	B♭/Gm/B♭/E♭/B♭	Originally issued as a player piano roll; posthumously transcribed and published in 1971. Scott Joplin - Silver Swan Rag (1914)	
Magnetic Rag	Rag	1914	Intro AA BB CC Trans. DD AA Coda	B♭/Gm/B♭/B♭m/B♭	Scott Joplin - Magnetic Rag (1914)	
Frolic of the Bears	Syncopated Waltz	1915	Intro A B1 B2 C Trans. A B1 B2 C Trans. A Coda	Em	Revised excerpt from Treemonisha.	
Magnetic Rag	Song	1915(?)	Unknown.	Unknown.	Lost – unpublished. Seen by biographers Rudi Blesh, and Harriet Janis in 1950.	
Confidence Rag	Rag	1915(?)	Unknown.	Unknown.	Lost – incomplete, and unpublished. Seen by biographers Rudi Blesh, and Harriet Janis in 1950.	
For the Sake of All	Song	1915(?)	Unknown.	Unknown.	Lost – incomplete, and unpublished. Seen by biographers Rudi Blesh, and Harriet Janis in 1950.	
Morning Glories	Song	1915	Unknown.	Unknown.	Lost – incomplete, and unpublished. Announced by the composer in the Indianapolis Freeman newspaper, September 4, 1915. Seen by biographers Rudi Blesh, and Harriet Janis in 1950.	
Syncopated Jamboree	Vaudeville Act	1915	Unknown.	Unknown.	Lost – unpublished. Announced in the Indianapolis Freeman newspaper, September 18, 1915.	
Pretty Pansy Rag	Rag	1915(?)	Unknown.	Unknown.	Lost – unpublished. A copy was given by the composer to Martin Niederhoffer. Seen by biographers Rudi Blesh, Harriet Janis, and performed by James P. Johnson in 1950.	
Recitative Rag	Rag	1915(?)	Unknown.	Unknown.	Lost – unpublished. Seen by biographers Rudi Blesh, Harriet Janis, and performed by James P. Johnson in 1950.	
If	Musical Comedy	1916	Unknown.	Unknown.	Lost – unpublished. Announced as completed in the New York Age September 7, 1916.	
Symphony No. 1	Symphony	1916	Unknown.	Unknown.	Lost – incomplete, and unpublished. Announced in the New York Age September 7, 1916.	
Piano Concerto	Piano Concerto	1917(?)	Unknown.	Unknown.	Lost – incomplete, and unpublished.	
Reflection Rag	Rag	1917	Intro AA BB CC DD EE	B♭/Gm/B♭/E♭/E♭	Published posthumously by Stark. Likely composed in 1907.	

Cover pages of various works
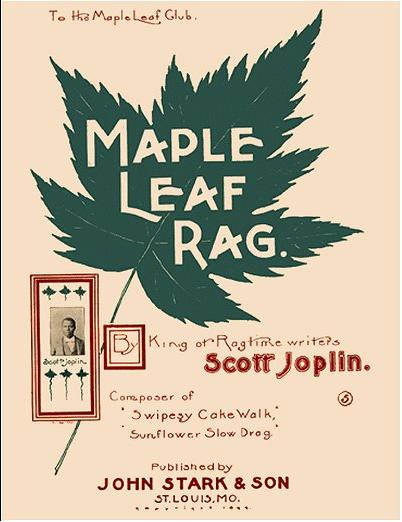
Third edition of the "Maple Leaf Rag" sheet music, pre 1923

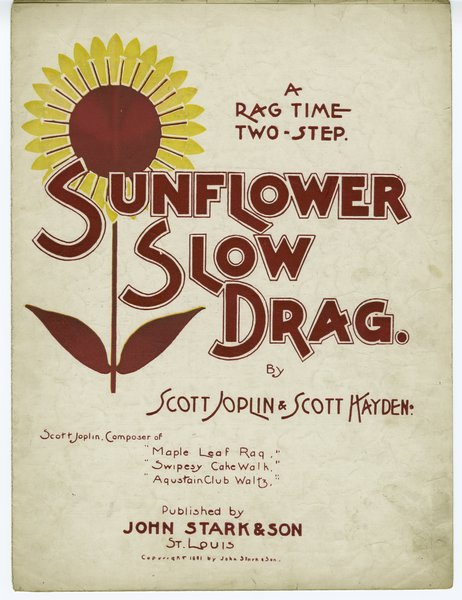
Sunflower Slow Drag, 1901

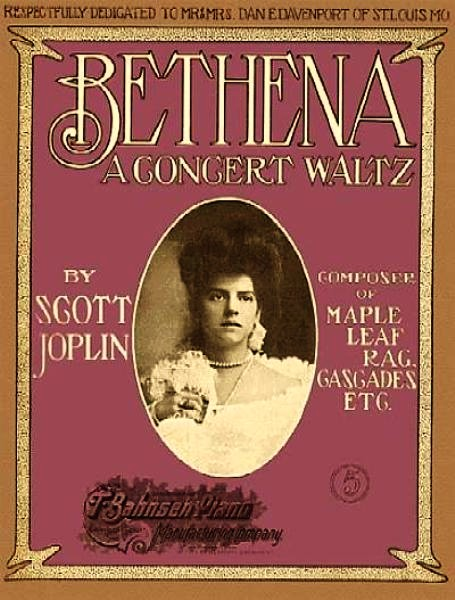
Bethena, 1905

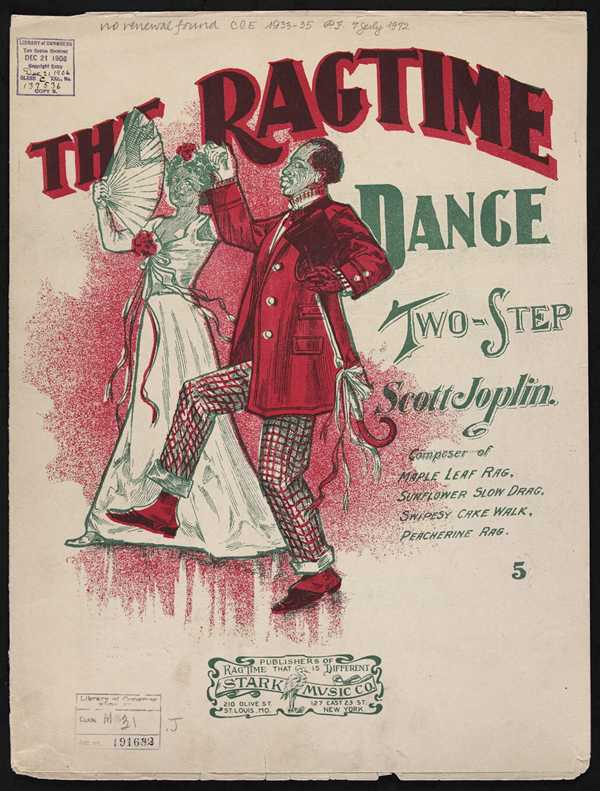
The Ragtime Dance, 1906

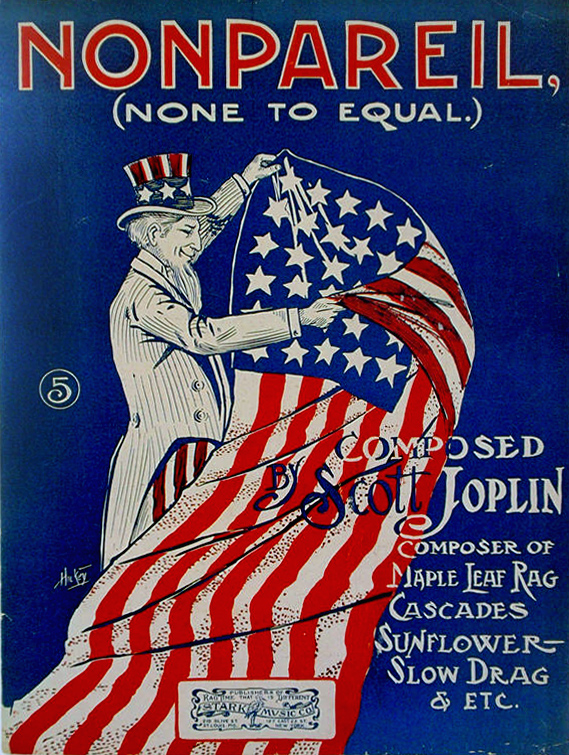
Nonpareil, 1907

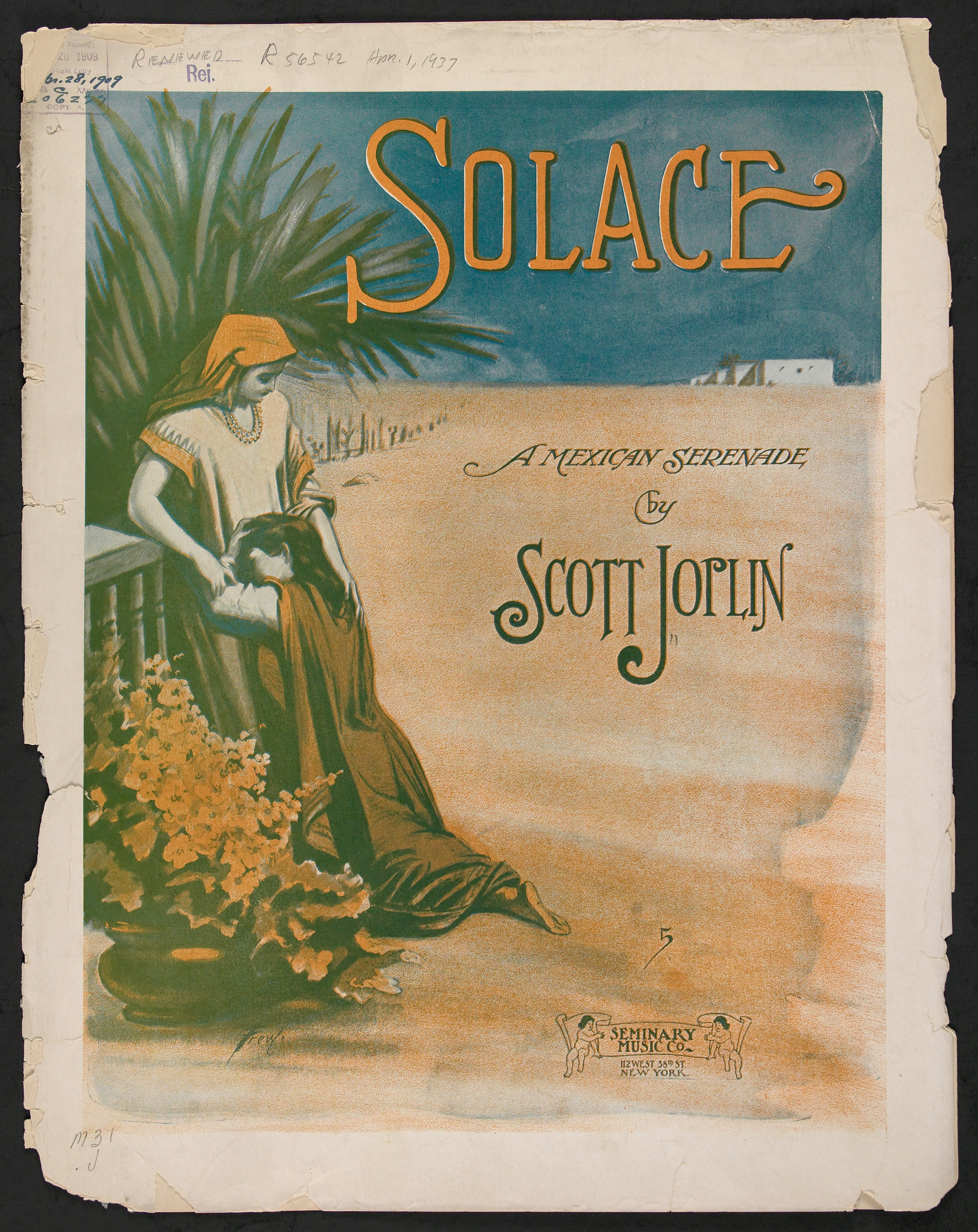
Solace, 1909

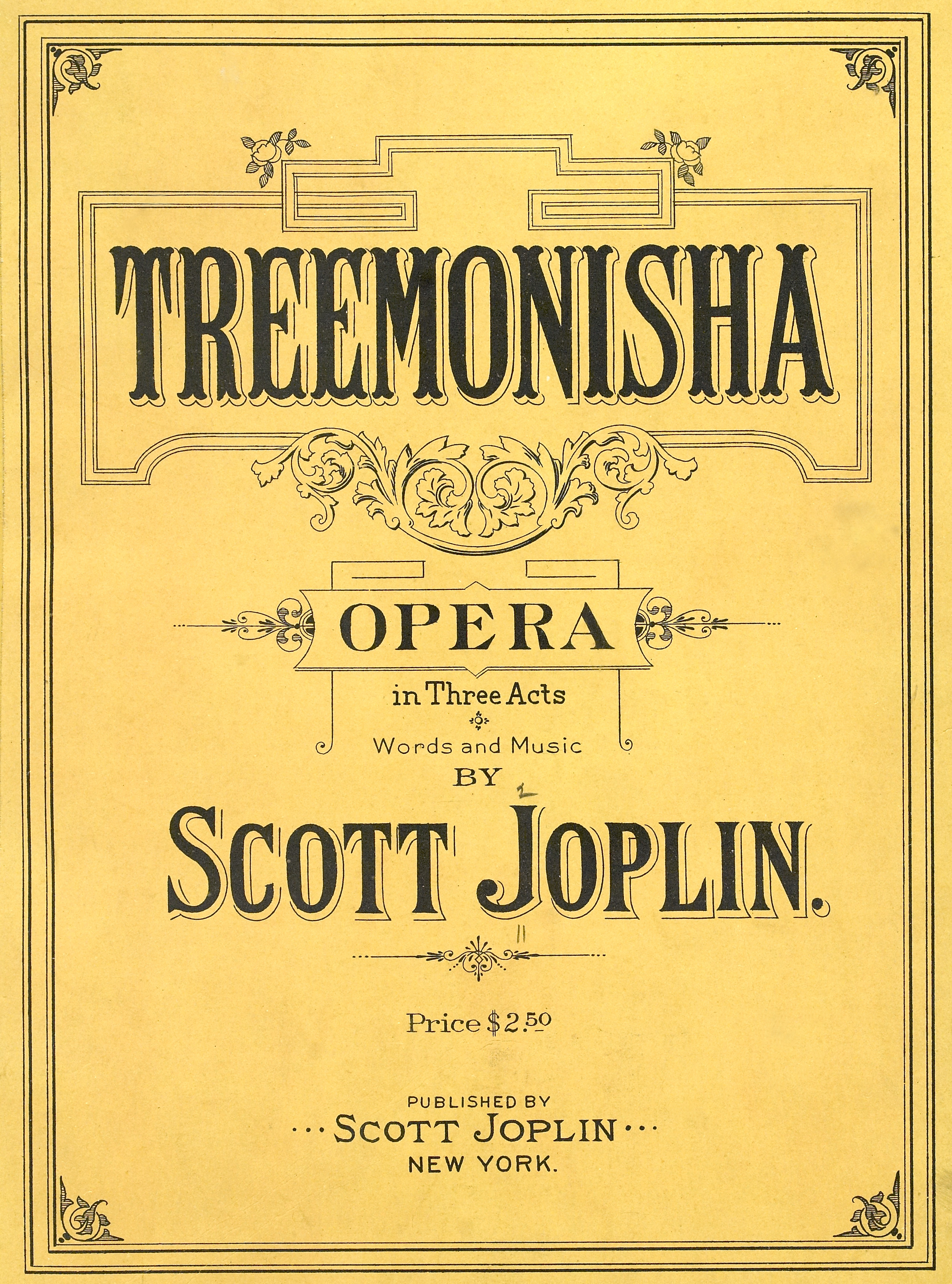
Treemonisha, 1911

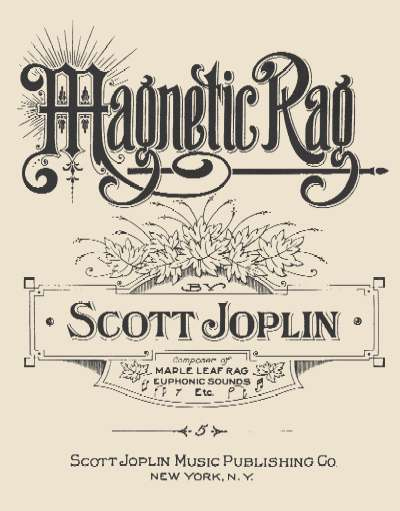
Magnetic Rag, 1914

== Bibliography ==
- Berlin, Edward A. (1994). King of Ragtime: Scott Joplin and His Era. Oxford University Press. ISBN 0-19-510108-1.
- Berlin, Edward A. (2016). King of Ragtime: Scott Joplin and His Era (2nd ed.). Oxford University Press. ISBN 978-0-19-974032-1.
- Blesh, Rudi (1981). "Scott Joplin: Black-American Classicist". In Brodsky Lawrence, Vera (ed.). Scott Joplin Complete Piano Works. New York Public Library. ISBN 0-87104-272-X.
- Curtis, Susan (1999). Lawrence O. Christensen; William E. Foley; Gary Kremer (eds.). Dictionary of Missouri Biography. University of Missouri Press. ISBN 9780826260161.
- Davis, Francis (1995). The History of the Blues:The Roots, the Music, the People. Hyperion. ISBN 0-306-81296-7.
- Jasen, David A.; Tichenor, Trebor Jay (1978). Rags and Ragtime: A Musical History. New York, NY: Dover Publications, Inc. ISBN 0-486-25922-6.
- Kirk, Elise Kuhl (2001). American Opera. University of Illinois Press. ISBN 0-252-02623-3.
- Scott, William B.; Rutkoff, Peter M. (2001). New York Modern: The Arts and the City. Johns Hopkins University Press. ISBN 0-8018-6793-2.
- Whitcomb, Ian (1986). After the Ball. Hal Leonard Corp. ISBN 0-87910-063-X.
- Williams, Martin, ed. (1987). The Smithsonian Collection of Classic Jazz. Smithsonian Institution Press. ISBN 0-393-99342-6.
