= Bethena =

1905 waltz by Scott Joplin

- by Scott Joplin
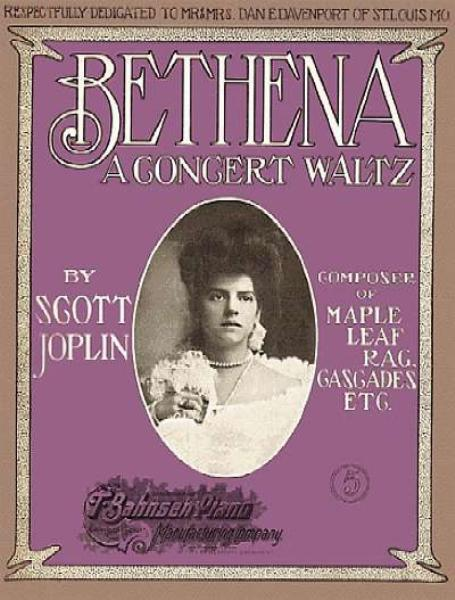
- Cover to the original edition of Bethena – A Concert Waltz
- Genre: Ragtime
- Form: Concert waltz
- Published: 1905
- Publisher: T. Bahnsen Piano Manufacturing Co. St. Louis Mo.
- "Bethena" "Bethena" performed on a piano

"Bethena, A Concert Waltz" (copyright registered March 6, 1905) is a composition by Scott Joplin. It was the first Joplin work since his wife Freddie's death on September 10, 1904, of pneumonia, ten weeks after their wedding. At the time the composer had significant financial problems; the work did not sell successfully at the time of publication and was soon neglected and forgotten. It was rediscovered as a result of the Joplin revival in the 1970s and has received acclaim from Joplin's biographers and other critics. The piece combines two different styles of music, the classical waltz and the rag, and has been seen as demonstrating Joplin's excellence as a classical composer. The work has been described as "an enchantingly beautiful piece that is among the greatest of Ragtime Waltzes", a "masterpiece", and "Joplin's finest waltz".

== Background and composition ==
At the time, Joplin's principal claim to fame was the publication in 1899 of the Maple Leaf Rag, which became a best-selling instrumental hit, and provided the composer with a steady income for the rest of his life from the royalties. Despite this success early on in his career (he was named as the "King of Ragtime" by numerous contemporaries), he had continued financial problems and never repeated the success of the Maple Leaf Rag. In the fall of 1903, Joplin lost a large amount of money on the national tour of his first opera, A Guest of Honor, when the box office receipts were stolen by an unidentified associate. Joplin's belongings, including the score for the opera, were confiscated for non-payment of his boarding-house bills. The opera is now considered lost, as no copy was registered with the Copyright Office, and none has been found since. Subsequently, Joplin was short of money and is thought to have been actively seeking commissions.

After divorce from his first wife Belle—a "disastrous" relationship underscored by the loss of their infant daughter—Joplin married his 19-year-old second wife Freddie in June 1904. He had dedicated to her his rag The Chrysanthemum which was published in that year. She died on 10 September 1904 of pneumonia ten weeks after their wedding. Joplin's whereabouts are unknown from that point until early 1905, when he returned to St. Louis, Missouri where some of Joplin's known associates, such as pianist Louis Chauvin and musician Joe Jordan, still lived. On 6 March, Joplin registered the copyright of Bethena, A Concert Waltz, and dedicated the work to the otherwise little-known "Mr. and Mrs. Dan E. Davenport of St. Louis Mo". The copyright date is significant because not all Joplin works were registered for copyright purposes and there is a lack of detail about many aspects of Joplin's life, including when many of the pieces were composed.

Biographer Edward A. Berlin speculated that this dedication was unusual because the Davenports were not able to help Joplin professionally by showcasing his work or commissioning more, but was a recognition of the personal support that they had given him through the difficult time after Freddie's death. The origin of the name "Bethena" is a mystery, and the identity of the woman featured on the cover of the work's original publication is unknown. It has been claimed that the image is of Freddie from her wedding day, although positive identification is made more difficult because the photograph on the cover of the piece does not show the subject's race clearly.

The work was published by the "T. Bahnsen Piano Manufacturing Company, St. Louis", a firm which only published two other Joplin compositions. Berlin speculates that at this point in his career, despite the fame brought by the Maple Leaf Rag, Joplin was unable to arrange favorable terms with publishers; for example Joplin announced in July 1905 the completion of the song "You Stand Good with Me, Babe" which was never published, and no copies of the song have ever been found. Bethena was released at a difficult time for Joplin, both emotionally and financially; most of the compositions released in the two and a half years since the death of Freddie had been by little-known and insignificant publishers, were largely unnoticed at the time of publication and, except for Bethena, were not "quality Joplin". Joplin's finances remained in an unsatisfactory state and he wrote several works for hire.

== Form ==
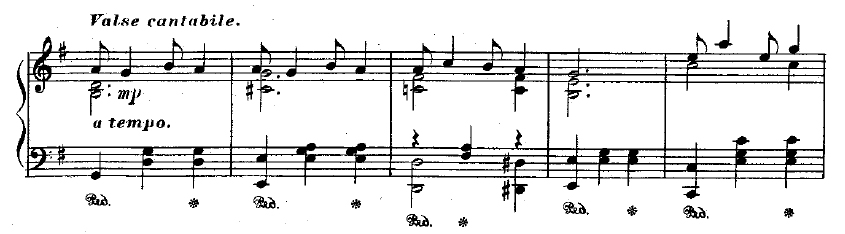
The A strain in G major, bars 9–13, showing the Waltz-style left hand as well as the syncopated melody in the right. The latter uses the first 4 notes of the Cakewalk rhythm.

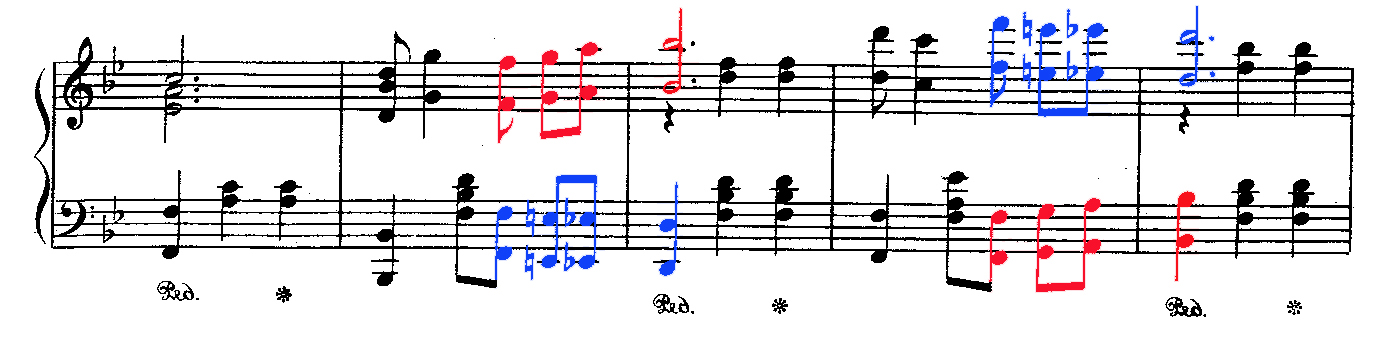
The B strain in B♭ major, bars 36–40, showing the contrapuntal contrary motion section, with the two melodies highlighted in blue and red

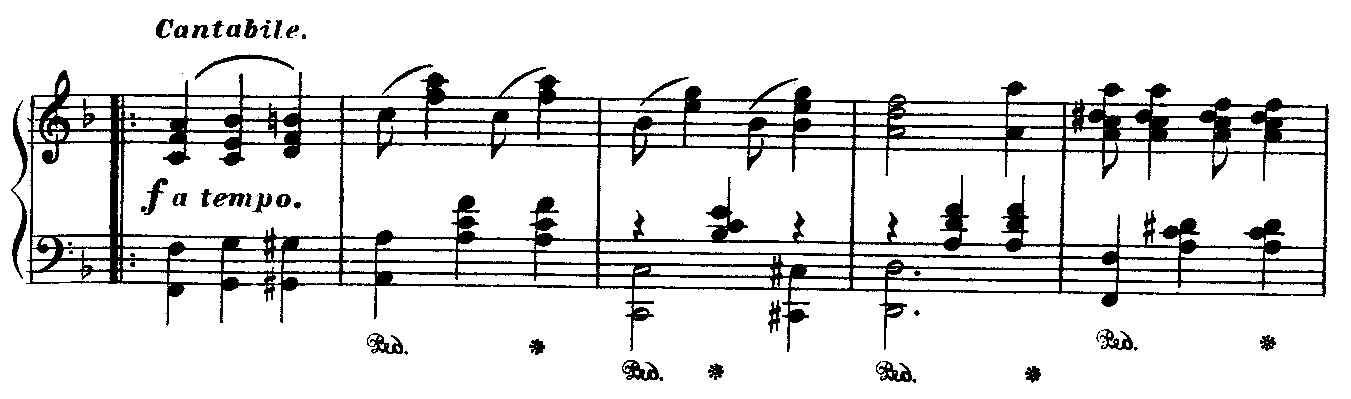
The C strain in F major, bars 77–81, showing the Waltz structure and counterpoint in the opening phrase, with the bass in octaves contrasting with the melody line in the treble

Introduction A BB A CC DD EE A Coda

Bethena has five musical strains in five different keys; G major, B♭ major, F major, B minor, and D major respectively. The sections are linked by "transitional passages" which enable the work to change key between the strains by means of a chromatic interlude or modulation. Each of the themes is written with the instruction "Cantabile", which means "songlike and flowing in style".

The piece is notated in 3/4 time with the main theme repeated three times in the work as well as in the introduction and the coda. The "sadly poignant", "graceful, wistful" and tenderly nostalgic mood is partly dictated by this main theme, which starts with the melody note A harmonised against a G major chord thus creating a dissonance. In the next measure the theme is set against a different harmony before Joplin creates variations. There are variants of the theme in the "haunting" B minor key of the D strain and in the E strain's D major key which "brightens the mood".

Joplin combines the waltz' "oom-pa-pah" rhythm and its conventionally accented three quarter notes in the bass, with a syncopated melody in the treble. The main melody line used in the introduction and then repeated regularly throughout, with its alternate unaccented eighth notes and accented quarter notes, is the rhythm of the Cakewalk minus the final note. The Cakewalk was a popular African-American dance which originated in plantation slave communities in nineteenth century America, and ultimately contributed to the musical style Ragtime. The simultaneous sounding of the two independent rhythms, the combination of the waltz in the bass and the syncopation of the main theme in the treble, is an example of a 4 against 3 polyrhythm. There are many subtle variations of this sequence which occur throughout the work.

The left hand follows the standard approach of classical waltzes, with a bass note followed by two mid-range chords, and in addition there are some contrapuntal passages where two melodies move independently but complement each other harmonically. For example, the B and C themes are examples of Joplin employing counterpoint in octaves. The B theme in the key of B♭ major is closely related to the main theme presenting its counterpoint with the bass and the treble melody lines moving in opposite directions (in contrary motion), to each other and then exchanging their melodies (bars 29-30 and 31–32). This pattern repeats itself during the theme. In the opening phrase (bars 77–81) of the "rag-like" C theme in the key of F major, counterpoint is evident with the harmony of the treble moving in contrary motion to the bass line in a similar way to that used in the B section. In the treble, the harmony falls from F to D, while the bass rises from F to G-sharp

== Critical reception ==
It is not clear what the composition's reception was at the time, and the piece's publication by a company which had little previous experience of this endeavour indicate that there was little positive impact on the composer's financial problems. Joplin wanted to be considered as a serious artist, and spoke of his preference for "classical music". Compositions such as Bethena, A Concert Waltz and his operas A Guest of Honor and Treemonisha indicate that he was trying to be taken seriously as a composer. Like many of his other works, Bethena was largely forgotten after Joplin's death from syphilis in 1917. The slow revival and re-discovery of Ragtime and Joplin started in the 1940s, although it concentrated on the rags such as the Maple Leaf Rag, rather than Bethena.

Joshua Rifkin's 1970 LP Piano Rags by Scott Joplin played a part in the Joplin revival of that decade, with sales of over 100,000 in the first year and subsequently becoming Nonesuch Records' first disk to sell over 1 million copies. Bethena was one of the pieces performed on the 1972 follow-up, Volume 2. The Billboard "Best-Selling Classical LPs" chart for 28 September 1974 has the first record at number 5, with the follow-up "Volume 2" at number 4, and a combined set of both volumes at number 3. Separately both volumes had been on the chart for 64 weeks. In 1979 New York Magazine wrote that by giving artists like Rifkin the opportunity to put Joplin's music on disk Nonesuch Records "created, almost alone, the Scott Joplin revival".

The composition was featured on the soundtrack to the 2008 Hollywood film The Curious Case of Benjamin Button. The performance of the composition by the pianist Randy Kerber was described by one critic on National Public Radio as "letting the inherent wistfulness of the music emerge", with the piece "perfectly suited" to the movie as it was a "tender and heartfelt remembrance of a love lost".

Joplin biographer Edward A. Berlin believed that Bethena was "an enchantingly beautiful piece that is among the greatest of ragtime waltzes" because of the repeated main theme in G major, the contrapuntal passages, and the harmonies. Another biographer, Rudi Blesh, wrote that the work was a "masterpiece", thanks to its rhythmic variations, the beauty of each strain's melodies and the richly scored harmony, especially when considered in comparison to the unsyncopated light salon style of Binks Waltz published in the same year. In another publication, Blesh described the work as "Joplin's finest waltz".

Other critics have praised the piece, with the author of a survey of American music noting that the rhythms of the waltz and ragtime combined to produce an "ingenious and delightful example of such a stylistic accommodation", showing that the composer was an "adventurous classicist par excellence" because he was able to combine tradition and innovation in a consistently inventive way. Another critic, the arranger of Joplin's music for solo Guitar, wrote that Bethena displayed Joplin's characteristic syncopated style in a "seductive" manner even in the waltz's 3/4 time signature.

== See also ==
- List of compositions by Scott Joplin

== Bibliography ==
- Berlin, Edward A. (1996). King of Ragtime - Scott Joplin and his Era. Oxford University Press. ISBN 0-19-510108-1.
- "Best Selling Classical LPs" (PDF). Billboard. New York: Billboard Publications Inc. 28 September 1974. p. 61.
- Blesh, Rudi (1981). Scott Joplin: Black-American Classicist, Introduction to Scott Joplin Complete Piano Works. New York Public Library. ISBN 0-87104-272-X.
- Blesh, Rudi; Janis, Harriet (2007) [1950]. They All Played Ragtime: The True Story of an American Music. Read Books. ISBN 978-1-4067-7326-2.
- Chase, Gilbert (1992). America's Music. University of Illinois Press. ISBN 0-252-06275-2. "America's Music."
- Jasen, David A.; Jones, Gordon Gene (2002). Black Bottom Stomp. Routledge. ISBN 0-415-93641-1.
- Joplin, Scott; De Chiaro, Giovanni (2001). Complete Works of Scott Joplin for Guitar. Mel Bay. ISBN 0-7866-3279-8.
- Magee, Jeffrey (1998). Nicholls, David (ed.). The Cambridge History of American Music (Illustrated ed.). Cambridge University Press. ISBN 0-521-45429-8.
- Miller, Michael (2005). The Complete Idiot's Guide to Music Theory (2nd ed.). Alpha Books. ISBN 1-59257-437-8.
- Scivales, Riccardo (2005). Jazz Piano, the Left Hand. Shacor, Inc. ISBN 1-929009-54-2. Archived from the original on 2012-11-07.
- "SibeliusMusic concert notes for Bethena (1905)".
