= Magnetic Rag =

Ragtime composition by Scott Joplin

- by Scott Joplin
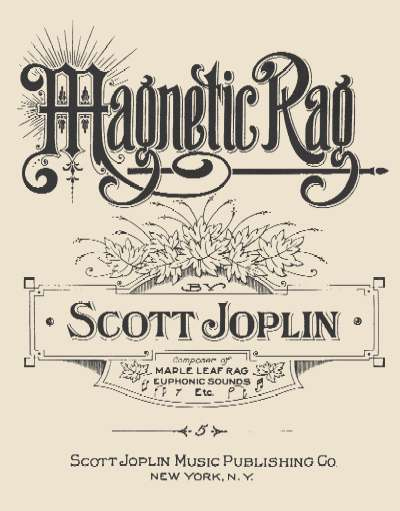
- "Magnetic Rag" cover page
- Genre: Ragtime
- Form: Rag
- Published: July 21, 1914
- Publisher: Scott Joplin Publishing Company
- Duration: 5:11
- Instrument: Solo piano

"Magnetic Rag" is a 1914 ragtime piano composition by American composer Scott Joplin. It is significant for being the last rag which Joplin published in his lifetime, three years before his death in 1917. It is also unique in form and in some of the musical techniques employed in the composition.

== Background ==
"Magnetic Rag" was written by an ailing Joplin near the end of his career, when interest in ragtime was waning. He was suffering from the latter stages of syphilis, the disease from which he died only three years later. Possibly as a result of Joplin's mood at this time, the piece expresses a melancholy almost entirely unheard in his earlier works.

== Form ==
While many of Joplin's piano rags fit the classic rag scheme, "Magnetic Rag" is unique in its form of AABBCCDDAA. Due to its novelty at the time, the form has been described as "progressive". It has been suggested that Joplin was trying to merge ragtime elements with the classical sonata form. The form is cyclic: that is, the opening melody is revisited at the end of the piece. Cyclic form is rare among Joplin's rags.

Joplin's usage of Italian tempo indications in "Magnetic Rag" has been interpreted as his intention to give the piece a serious aspect in a similar manner to Treemonisha and "Scott Joplin's New Rag". "Magnetic Rag" begins with the instruction "Allegretto ma non troppo" (moderately fast, but not too much) and continues in the D strain with "Tempo l'istesso" (tempo remains the same), a warning against slowing down for the minor-mode section. Joplin also employed in "Magnetic Rag" the classic "common time" 4/4 time signature instead of the more usual 2/4 time of rag tunes. Simultaneously, Joplin doubled all the note values, effectively making the unusual 4/4 time signature have no practical effect on the way the piece sounded or the way it was performed. His publishing it in 4/4 was simply a way to connect the rag with classical and popular piano works of prior fame. Since Joplin published "Magnetic Rag" himself, it has been suggested that the composition fully reflected his wishes and contained no compromises.

Joplin produced "Magnetic Rag" during what several musicologists consider to be his experimental period. It was at this time that Joplin attempted to write rags that were not confined to the standard "oom-pah" left-hand beat and that incorporated several other novelties.

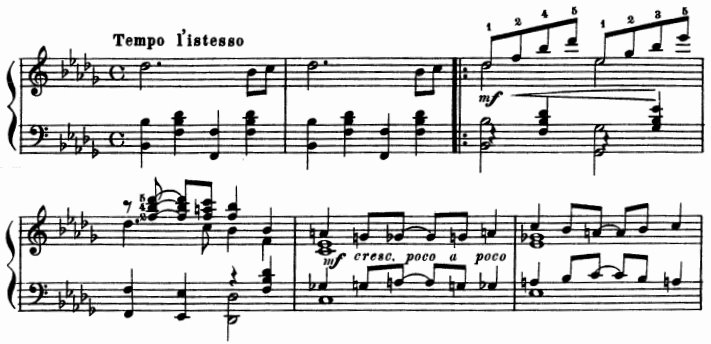
The first 6 bars of section D, showing Joplin's departure from usual ragtime form. He has both parts play in unison, and he departs from the standard 2/4 left-hand rhythm. This is part of the original published score.

Like the classic rag, "Magnetic Rag" begins with a four-bar introduction. Since it is featured at both the beginning and end of the piece, the melody of the A strain is possibly the most recognizable melody in the piece. Much of this melody is in the mode of B♭ major, the main key of the entire piece; however, during bars 11 and 12, the mode shifts to G minor. This shift demonstrates one of Joplin's late-life techniques: establishing a foreign key within the framework of a strain.

The second, third, and fourth strains are what made "Magnetic Rag" unique among Joplin's rags. The B strain is written entirely in G minor. The darkening tone generated by the minor scale stands out among Joplin's rags, and is revisited in the D strain.

In contrast to the minor themes in the B strain, the third section is upbeat but with bittersweet harmonies, returning once again to the key of B♭ major. Here, for the first time, the piece departs from the standard left-hand pattern that characterizes most ragtime. This section of the piece has been compared to the style of twelve bar blues. The C strain also represents the only known time when Joplin departs from the standard sixteen-bar form, being instead 24 bars in length with an uneven 14- and 10-bar division. Its first 12 measures parallel the 12-bar blues form and the next two measures extend the subdominant as a transition into the last ten bars.

Of all the strains in the piece, the final D strain is perhaps the most interesting. It is written in B♭ minor. When Joplin used minor keys in the previous sections, he used the relative key of G minor (i.e., relative to the main key of B♭ major). However, in this fourth section, he instead used the parallel key. This strain also features sections where the right hand and left hand play notes in unison, and in which the standard 2/4 time left-hand beat is noticeably absent. Most of Joplin's rags end with the last strain, but "Magnetic Rag" ends with a coda. This "smiling little coda" expresses some of the tonalities and rhythms heard throughout the piece.

== Legacy ==
"Magnetic Rag" is widely understood to present a one-of-a-kind combination of moods, especially for ragtime, and has been described as a melancholic and "haunting" rag.

With the Brahmsian darkness of… "Magnetic Rag," the last piece he completed, Joplin had pushed the music far beyond the boisterous beerhall ambience that characterized, for many listeners and players, the rag idiom. This was music on a large scale that was now being squeezed into the narrow confines of rag form—so much so, that the music often burst at the seams.

Some music historians evaluate "Magnetic Rag", as well as other works from Joplin's late period, as being indicative of his unstable mental condition which resulted from the effects of syphilis. One of these is Martin Williams:

Joplin's "last period" is a strange collection of contradictions. Some of his rags reach more toward concert music than did any Jazz up to Lennie Tristano's, while others seem to revert to his 1900 style. Profoundly ambitious passages lie side by side with meaningless, mechanical ditties. It is not hard to find in these compositions a reflection of approaching derangement—he lost his mind in 1916.

In This Is Ragtime, Terry Waldo criticizes this view:

To see Joplin's late rags as a "strange collection of contradictions"… misses the point.… "Magnetic Rag" does indeed include parts reminiscent of Joplin's 1900 style, but they serve to set up the "profound" parts. Here is a terrifying mixture of the familiar and the agonizing unknown. It is in fact more profound for being able to bring these opposites into focus. The music is heavy with the weight of Joplin's approaching schizoid nightmare—but that is not a weakness.

In his biography of Scott Joplin, James Haskins writes:

Early in 1914 he completed what many consider his finest rag, "Magnetic Rag," which he published himself that same year. It has about it a gentle quality like "The Entertainer," and its distinctive form and range of moods suggest to some musicologists a breakthrough to a Chopinesque form of ragtime, albeit a breakthrough that came too late.

Near the end of his life, Scott Joplin was taking ragtime in a new direction by adding emphasis on form and tonality, and attempting to combine the characteristics of classical Western music and traditional ragtime. This is an entirely different direction than the one that jazz would take.

Jazz, seeking one theme as a center for improvisation, tended to weaken the sense of form that it inherited from ragtime.… Joplin's efforts obviously strengthen this sense of form. One has only to hear the blazing return of the first theme of Magnetic Rag—the restoration of major tonality, the momentum of the renewed beat—to recognize the power of recapitulation in ragtime.

In the album notes to Scott Joplin: Piano Rags, Joshua Rifkin describes the "Magnetic Rag" as a "valedictory work" with Joplin paying "tribute" to a "transplanted Middle-European dance music" and the European masters whom he tried to emulate. Rifkin speculates that the composition's short coda also "seems like a farewell, as if he knew how brief and bleak was the time still allotted him." In 1979 Alan Rich in the New York Magazine wrote that by giving artists like Rifkin the opportunity to put Joplin's music on record Nonesuch Records "created, almost alone, the Scott Joplin revival."

== See also ==
- List of compositions by Scott Joplin
