= Solace (Joplin) =

1909 composition

- by Scott Joplin
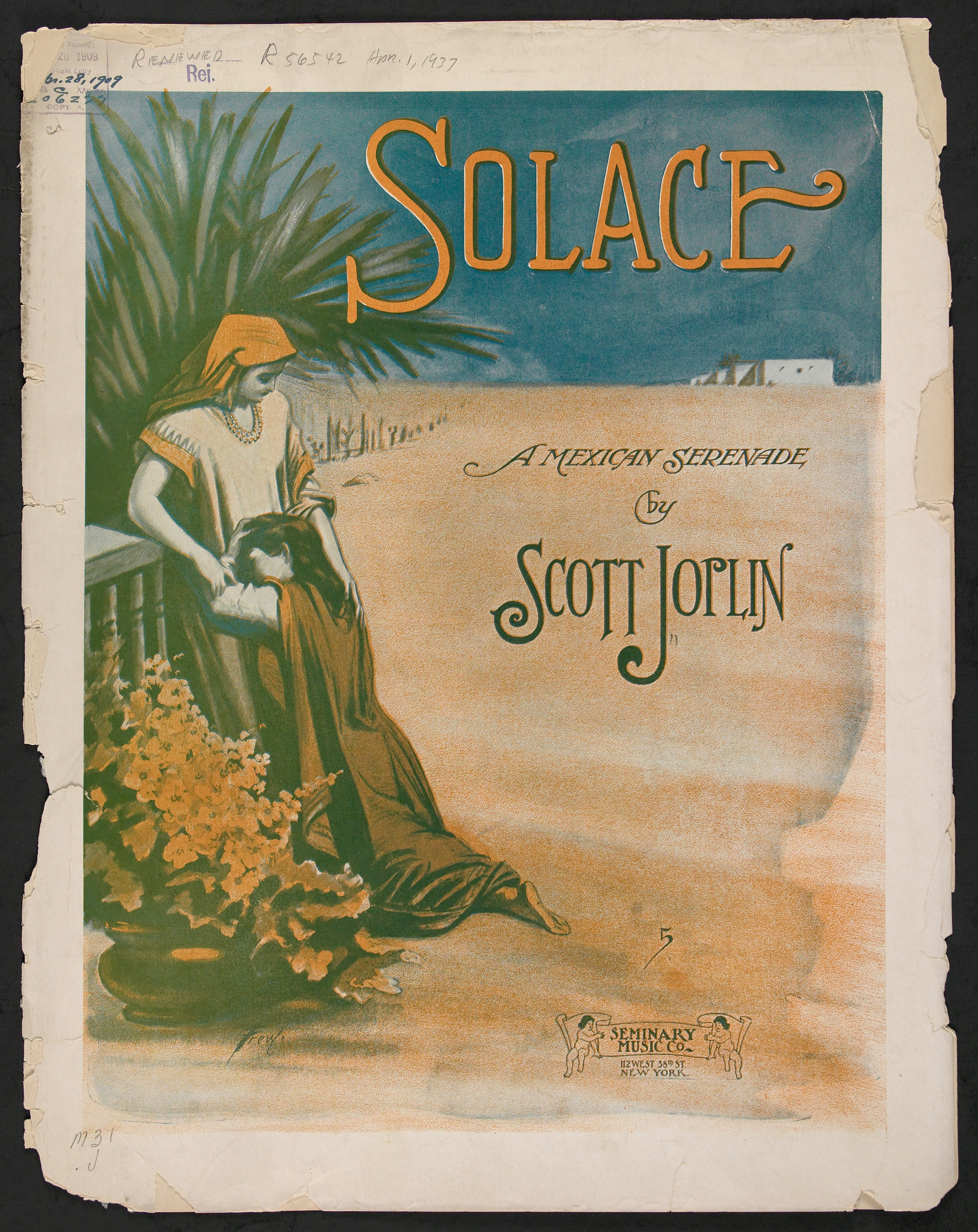
- 1909 cover of "Solace"
- Form: Habanera / Mexican serenade
- Published: 1909
- Publisher: Seminary Music Co., New York

Audio
- Joplin, "Solace", Performed by Constantin Stephan: file; help

"Solace" is a 1909 habanera written by Scott Joplin.

== Music ==
Beginning of "Solace"

Although Joplin labeled the piece "a Mexican Serenade", its origins are probably Cuban, and it is considered to have a habanera (and tango) rhythm in three of the four strains (Note: Edward A. Berlin considers "Solace" a habanera throughout.) – something unique for a work by Joplin, buta brief habanera bass did appear in "Wall Street Rag", his previous composition of the same year.

"Solace" is marked "very slow march time", and while it is difficult to determine the intended speed, it has been played andante (around ♪112). The first two strains have a key signature of C major, while the third and fourth are in F major.

== History ==
Similarities between Latin-American music and Joplin's familiar ragtime had been noted as early as 1897 by Ben Harney. Tangos were introduced to the United States as early as 1860 by Louis Moreau Gottschalk's "Souvenir de la Havane". Perhaps the first example of tango composed by an African American was Jess Pickett's rag-tango "The Dream", played at the 1893 Chicago World's Fair. William H. Tyers' "Maori" was a famous African-American tango published a year before "Solace", but the two pieces do not share resemblance. In contrast, the first strain of "Solace" contains a theme closely resembling part of Will H. Etter's "Whoa! Maud", published four years before "Solace".

"Solace" was registered for copyright on April 28, 1909 when Joplin was in his early 40s and recently married.

Alongside "Gladiolus Rag", "Pine Apple Rag", "The Ragtime Dance", and "The Entertainer", "Solace" was one of Joplin's compositions featured in the soundtrack of the 1973 film The Sting and helped to revive his music's popularity.
