= The Ragtime Dance =

1902 composition by Scott Joplin

- by Scott Joplin
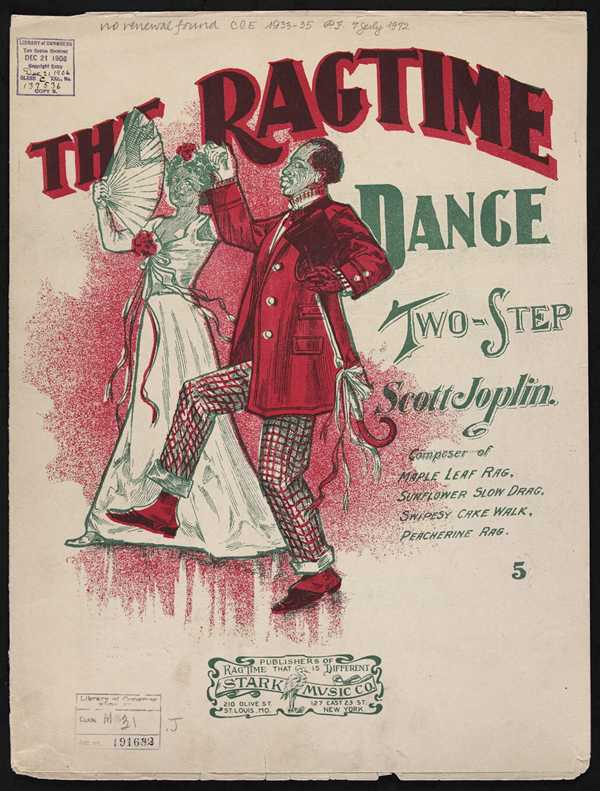
- Cover art for the 1906 sheet music
- Genre: Ragtime Folk Ballet
- Form: A Stop-Time Two Step
- Published: 1902 & 1906
- Publisher: John Stark & Son
- Instrument: Piano Solo

"The Ragtime Dance" is a piece of ragtime music by Scott Joplin, first published in 1902.

== Publication history ==
Although the piece was performed in Sedalia, Missouri on November 24, 1899, it wasn't published until 1902. John Stillwell Stark had planned publishing it in September of 1899, but had doubts about the marketability of the piece and delayed publication. When he eventually published it in 1902, at the urging of his daughter, it was a commercial failure.

The 1902 arrangement was a short ragtime folk ballet suitable for stage performance, complete with narration and choreography. The narrator recounts a "dark town" ball that took place at 9 p.m. on a Thursday night and included a cakewalk. The choreography is for four couples.

Four years later, Stark republished the piece in a piano rag arrangement, stripped of its narration and choreography and substantially shortened. The copyright for this arrangement was registered December 21, 1906. The cover art for the 1906 sheet music featured an African American couple dancing in formal attire: the lady holds a fan, and the gentleman holds a top hat and cane.

Marvin Hamlisch incorporated "The Ragtime Dance" into a medley for the soundtrack of the Oscar-winning 1973 film The Sting. The song also appeared in the soundtrack of the 1978 film Pretty Baby and the 1980 Broadway musical revue Tintypes.

== 1902 Choreography ==
The interior cover of the 1902 sheet music states that "the choreography and stage direction for this song may be found wherever this song is sold." However, no copies of the choreography/stage directions are known to exist.

== Music (1906 arrangement) ==
The overall structure is: Intro AA BB CC D E F.

It opens in the key of B♭ major, but modulates to E♭ major at the start of the "B" section.

The piece was subtitled "A Stop-Time Two Step". "Stop-time" refers to an unusual effect used in the second half of the piece. Starting with the "D" section, the pianist is instructed to "Stamp the heel of one foot heavily upon the floor" in time with the beat. Joplin reused this effect in his 1910 "Stoptime Rag".

== Reception and legacy ==
In November 1970, Joshua Rifkin released a recording called Scott Joplin: Piano Rags on the classical label Nonesuch, which featured as its third track "The Ragtime Dance". It sold 100,000 copies in its first year and eventually became Nonesuch's first million-selling record. The Billboard "Best-Selling Classical LPs" chart for 28 September 1974 has the record at #5, with the follow-up "Volume 2" at #4, and a combined set of both volumes at #3. Separately both volumes had been on the chart for 64 weeks. The album was nominated in 1971 for two Grammy Award categories: Best Album Notes and Best Instrumental Soloist Performance (without orchestra), but at the ceremony on March 14, 1972, Rifkin did not win in any category. In 1979 Alan Rich in the New York Magazine wrote that by giving artists like Rifkin the opportunity to put Joplin's music on record Nonesuch Records "created, almost alone, the Scott Joplin revival."

== See also ==
- List of compositions by Scott Joplin

== Sources ==
- "1971 Grammy Winners: 14th Annual GRAMMY Awards". Grammy Awards.
- "Best Selling Classical LPs". Billboard. September 28, 1974. p. 61.
- Rich, Alan (December 24, 1979). "Music". New York. p. 81.
