= The Entertainer =

Piano rag by Scott Joplin

- by Scott Joplin
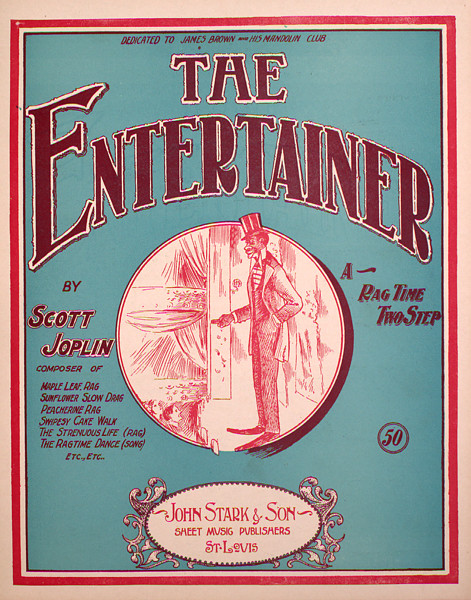
- First edition cover of "The Entertainer"
- Form: Ragtime, two step
- Published: 1902; 124 years ago
- Publisher: John Stark & Son
- Duration: Typically 3:53
- Live performance of "The Entertainer" in 2007

"The Entertainer" is a 1902 classic piano rag written by Scott Joplin.

It was sold first as sheet music by John Stark & Son of Saint Louis, Missouri, and in the 1910s as piano rolls that would play on player pianos. The first recording was by blues and ragtime musicians "the Blue Boys" in 1928, played on mandolin and guitar.

As one of the classics of the ragtime genre, it returned to international prominence as part of the style revival in the 1970s, when it was used as the theme music for the 1973 Oscar-winning film The Sting. Composer and pianist Marvin Hamlisch's adaptation reached No. 3 on the Billboard pop chart and spent a week at No. 1 on the easy listening chart in 1974.

The Recording Industry Association of America ranked it at No. 10 on its "Songs of the Century" list.

== Music ==
"The Entertainer" is subtitled "A Rag Time Two Step", which was a form of dance popular until about 1911, and a style which was common among rags written at the time.

Its structure is: Intro–AA–BB–A–CC–Intro2–DD.

It is primarily set in the key of C major; however, for the C section (commonly referred to as the "Trio"), it modulates to F major, then shifts back to C major for the D section. The B section contains an indication that the melody is to be played an octave higher on the repeat.

In the June 7, 1903, St. Louis Globe-Democrat, contemporary composer Monroe H. Rosenfeld described "The Entertainer" as "the best and most euphonious" of Joplin's compositions to that point. "It is a jingling work of a very original character, embracing various strains of a retentive character which set the foot in spontaneous action and leave an indelible imprint on the tympanum". Joplin may have performed the piece at a fundraiser in Parsons, Kansas, on April 27, 1904.

Suggested by the rag's dedication to "James Brown and his Mandolin Club", author Rudi Blesh wrote that "some of the melodies recall the pluckings and the fast tremolos of the little steel-stringed plectrum instruments". Stark issued an arrangement of the piece for two mandolins and a guitar.

Several sets of lyrics have been set to "The Entertainer". The most popular version appeared on The Muppet Show in Episode 203, sung by Milton Berle, who explains to the viewers that few are aware that there were lyrics for the song, which according to him are about "the performers, the entertainers during the heyday of Vaudeville". He is then joined in singing by several Muppets. More recently in 2020, Oscar Brown Jr. wrote a new set of lyrics to "The Entertainer" as a tribute to Joplin.

== Publication ==
The copyright on "The Entertainer" was registered December 29, 1902, along with two other Joplin rags, "A Breeze from Alabama" and "Elite Syncopations", all three of which were published by Stark. The centerpiece of the original cover art featured a minstrel show caricature of a black man in formal attire on a theater stage.

== Popularity and legacy ==
In November 1970, Joshua Rifkin released Scott Joplin: Piano Rags on the classical label Nonesuch; the album's second track is "The Entertainer". It sold 100,000 copies in its first year and eventually became Nonesuch's first million-selling record. The Billboard Best-Selling Classical LPs chart for September 28, 1974, has the record at No. 5, with the follow-up, Volume 2, at No. 4, and a combined set of both volumes at No. 3. Separately both volumes had been on the chart for 64 weeks. The album was nominated in 1971 for two Grammy Award categories, Best Album Notes and Best Instrumental Soloist Performance (without orchestra), but at the ceremony on March 14, 1972, Rifkin did not win in any category. In 1979 Alan Rich in the New York Magazine wrote that by giving artists like Rifkin the opportunity to put Joplin's music on disk, Nonesuch Records "created, almost alone, the Scott Joplin revival".

Marvin Hamlisch lightly adapted and orchestrated Joplin's music for the 1973 film The Sting, for which he won an Academy Award for Best Original Song Score and Adaptation in 1974 and a Grammy Award for Best Pop Instrumental Performance in 1975. His version of "The Entertainer" reached No. 3 on the Billboard Hot 100 on May 18, 1974, prompting The New York Times to write, "the whole nation has begun to take notice". Thanks to the film and its score, Joplin's work became appreciated in both the popular and classical music worlds, becoming the "classical phenomenon of the decade", in the words of music magazine Record World. The song has been played by many ice cream trucks in the United States and Canada to attract attention since its appearance in The Sting. "The Entertainer" is also popularly known as a hold music track, it being the default hold music for a Panasonic KX T30810CE telephone switchboard.

== See also ==
- List of compositions by Scott Joplin
- List of Billboard Easy Listening number ones of 1974
