= The Easy Winners =

Ragtime composition by Scott Joplin

- by Scott Joplin
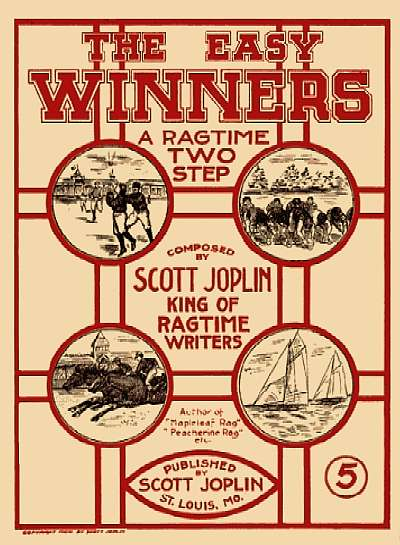
- Cover to the first edition sheet music
- Genre: Ragtime
- Form: Rag
- Published: 1901
- Publisher: Shattinger Music Company
- Instrument: Piano Solo

"The Easy Winners" is a ragtime composition by Scott Joplin. One of his most popular works, it was one of the four that had been recorded as of 1940.

== Title and cover ==
The title of the composition is a reference to athletes who are expected to win a sporting event without difficulty. The cover depicts scenes of baseball, football, horse racing and sailing.

== Musical structure ==
According to musicologist and Joplin biographer Edward A. Berlin, "'Easy Winners' must be judged one of Joplin's great works. It has a classical balance between its strains, its moods, and in its progression from the smooth calm of strain A to the sporadic agitation of strain D."

The composition follows the structural pattern typical of many Joplin rags, although the pattern is extended to include an introduction before strain A and another before strain C, commonly called the trio. Thus, the structure reads:

Intro AA BB A Trio-Intro CC DD

The introduction and strains A and B are played in A♭ major. The second half of the composition is played in the subdominant key of D♭ major.

In keeping with the sports theme of the composition, Joplin begins the trio with an introduction that is reminiscent of the first call used before a horse race.

== Trio and strain D ==
Berlin notes that the trio is the composition's outstanding feature, revealing "musical thinking unusual for ragtime." One of Joplin's signature compositional techniques was the use of voice leading in harmonized melodic lines, particularly the use of an inner voice descending a chromatic fourth. Although Joplin often used the technique to bring resolution to individual strains, in "The Easy Winners," he builds the entire trio on the concept. The trio has four similar phrases that feature an inner voice descending from B♭ to A♭, all being interrupted before spelling out a full fourth. Finally, in the last five measures of the trio, Joplin begins the phrase an extra semitone higher at C♭ and completes the chromatic descent to F♮. To emphasize this chromatic descent, Joplin double-stems the notes, suggesting they be brought out in performance.

Another notable feature of the trio is Joplin's use of a contrapuntal bass line. Played by the left hand in octaves in the last five measures, it heightens the complexity of the chromatic descent in the right hand and helps bring the strain to resolution.

To further emphasize the importance of the trio's climactic phrase, the last five measures of the trio and D strains are identical, producing what Jasen and Tichenor call a "strong echo-like effect."

== Publication history ==
The copyright was registered October 10, 1901. The Shattinger Music Company of St. Louis, Missouri bought the piece and published a simplified version. Only later did John Stillwell Stark publish it as-written.

== See also ==
- List of compositions by Scott Joplin
