= Silver Swan =

Silver Swan may refer to:

- Silver Swan (automaton), a clockwork display at the Bowes Museum
- Silver Swan (brand), a condiments brand owned by Nutri-Asia
- Silver Swan (character), a fictional character in the Wonder Woman stories
- "The Silver Swan" (madrigal), a madrigal by Orlando Gibbons
- "Silver Swan Rag", a piano rag by Scott Joplin
