= Searchlight Rag =

1907 musical composition

- by Scott Joplin
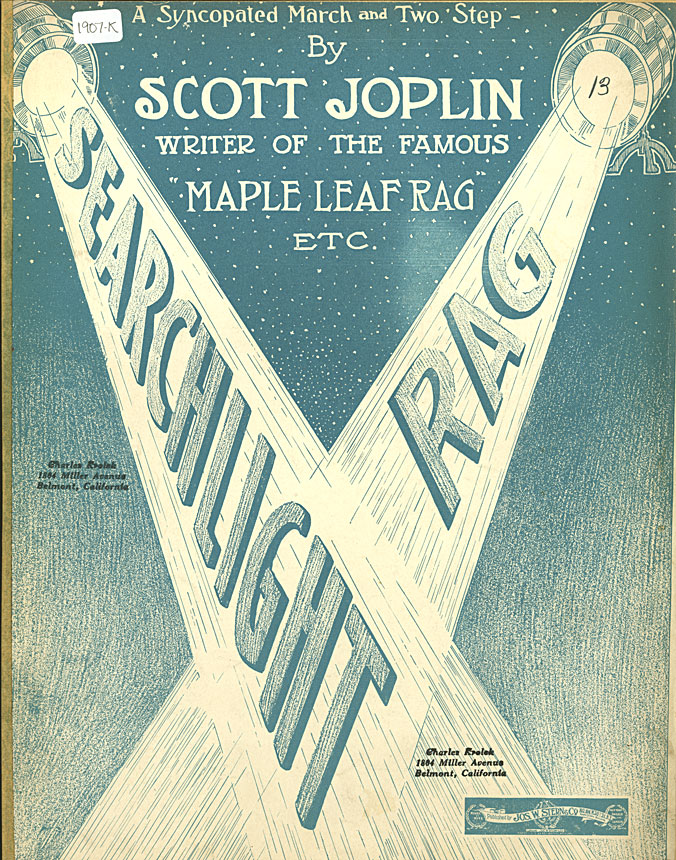
- 1907 frontal cover of the sheet music.
- Genre: Ragtime
- Form: A Syncopated March and Two Step
- Published: 1907
- Publisher: Joseph W.Stern & Co

Searchlight Rag

The "Searchlight Rag" is a ragtime composition by Scott Joplin, first published in 1907. It was named after the town of Searchlight, Nevada, where his friends had gone prospecting, inspiring the title.

== History ==
In 1907, the "Searchlight Rag" by Scott Joplin was published. In the early 1890s, Joplin's friends, the brothers Tom and Charles Turpin, had done prospecting in the Searchlight, Nevada area. The brothers' frequent stories of this experience, recounted to the patrons of their bar, inspired the title of the rag.

== Musical structure ==
Intro A A B B A C C D D

== Publication history ==
The copyright was registered August 12, 1907 to Joseph W. Stern and Company of New York.

Like most Joplin compositions, "Searchlight Rag" was still under copyright during the ragtime revival of the 1970s, and the holder of copyrights for this piece, "Fig Leaf Rag" and "Rose Leaf Rag" withheld permission for their inclusion in the definitive New York Public Library edition of Joplin's works and other collections.

== In popular culture ==
The "Searchlight Rag" was used as "Ragtime Style" music in RollerCoaster Tycoon's Added Attractions and Loopy Landscapes expansion pack and the game Roller Coaster Tycoon 2.

The concert band work "Chautauqua" by Robert W. Smith incorporates "Searchlight Rag."

== See also ==
- List of compositions by Scott Joplin
