= Original Rags =

1899 Ragtime Medley by Scott Joplin

- by Scott Joplin
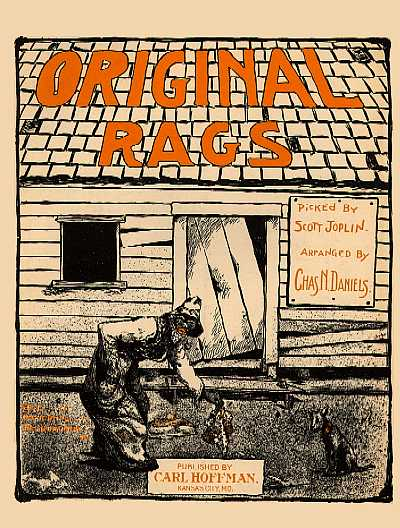
- Front cover of Original Rags sheet music
- Genre: Ragtime
- Form: Rag
- Published: 1899
- Publisher: Carl Hoffman
- Instrument: Piano Solo; Arranged by Charles N. Daniels

"Original Rags" (copyrighted March 15, 1899) was an early ragtime medley for piano. It was the first of Scott Joplin's rags to appear in print, in early 1899, preceding his "Maple Leaf Rag" by half a year.

== Publication history ==
The tune's copyright was registered on March 15, 1899, and it was first published by Carl Hoffman of Kansas City, Missouri. The original cover page showed an elderly black man picking up rags in front of a ramshackle cabin, and has been interpreted as a double pun, first on the activities of a rag (or junk) picker, and second on a slang term for ragtime, "picking the piano". The rag was given the following credits:

Picked By Scott Joplin
Arranged By Chas. N. Daniels.

It is not known whether Charles N. Daniels actually arranged the piece, or merely transcribed it. Joplin biographer Rudi Blesh thought it more likely that the credit to Daniels was the publisher's way of acknowledging his help in recommending the piece for publication; Blesh wrote that the music was "unmistakably Joplin" in style.

== Structure ==
The composition has the following musical structure:

Introduction AA BB CC Modulation A DD EE.

The rag is not in the sequence "AA BB A CC DD" more typical of Joplin. Like the posthumously published "Reflection Rag", it features five themes, but the "Original Rag" delays reentry of the first theme until after the modulation. The piece is mostly in G major except for the "C" section, which is in C major, and the "D" section (marked "Brilliant" in the sheet music), which is in D major. Ragtime historians have commented on the harmonic similarity between the "D" section of "Original Rags" and the "A" section of H. O. Wheeler's "A Virginny Frolic" published by Carl Hoffman the year before. Blesh appreciated it as "a charming and auspicious beginning to the life work of the master ragtime composer".

== See also ==
- Rag-picker
- List of compositions by Scott Joplin
