= Stop-time =

Musical accompaniment pattern

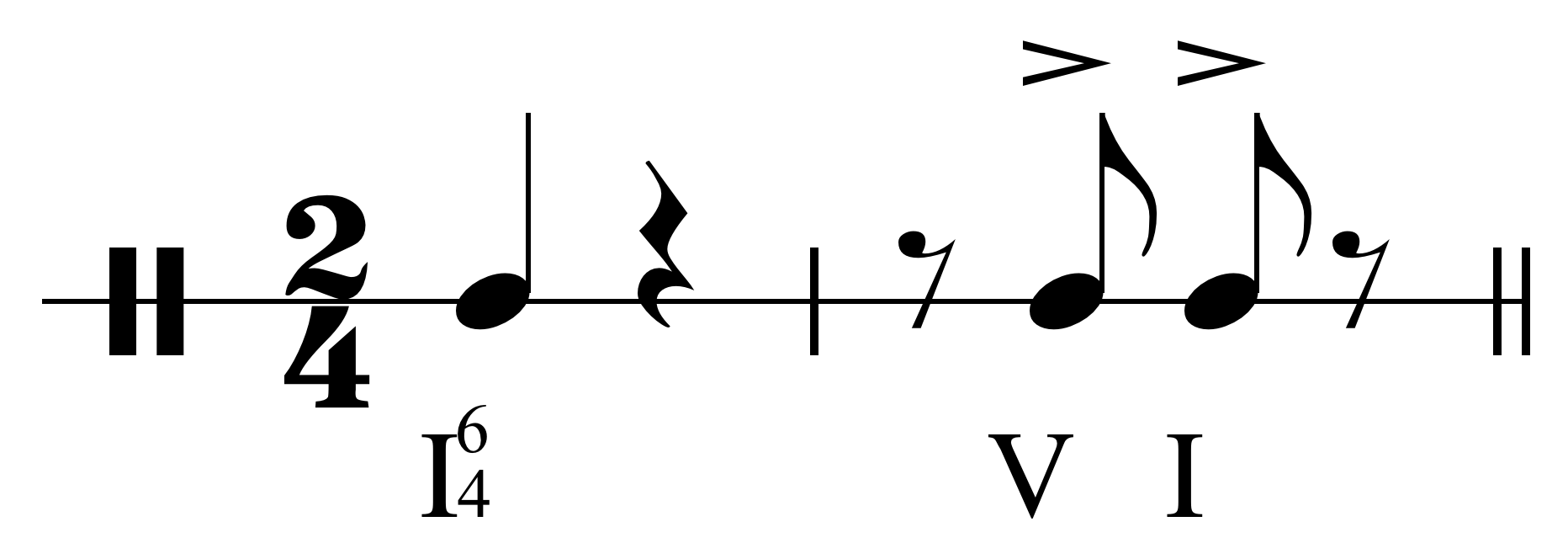
Stop-time cadential pattern.

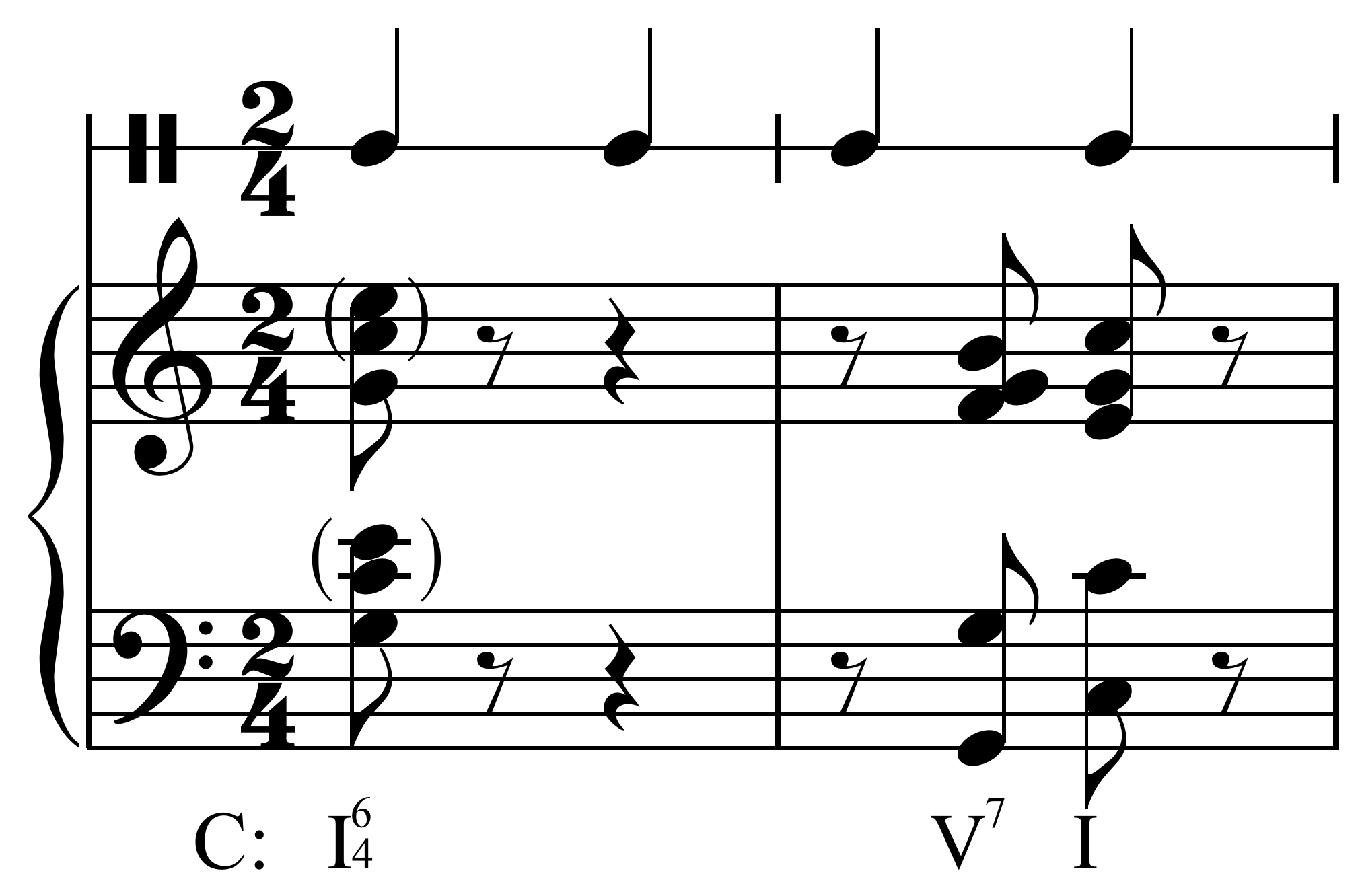
Stop-time in Scott Joplin's "Stoptime Rag" (1910)

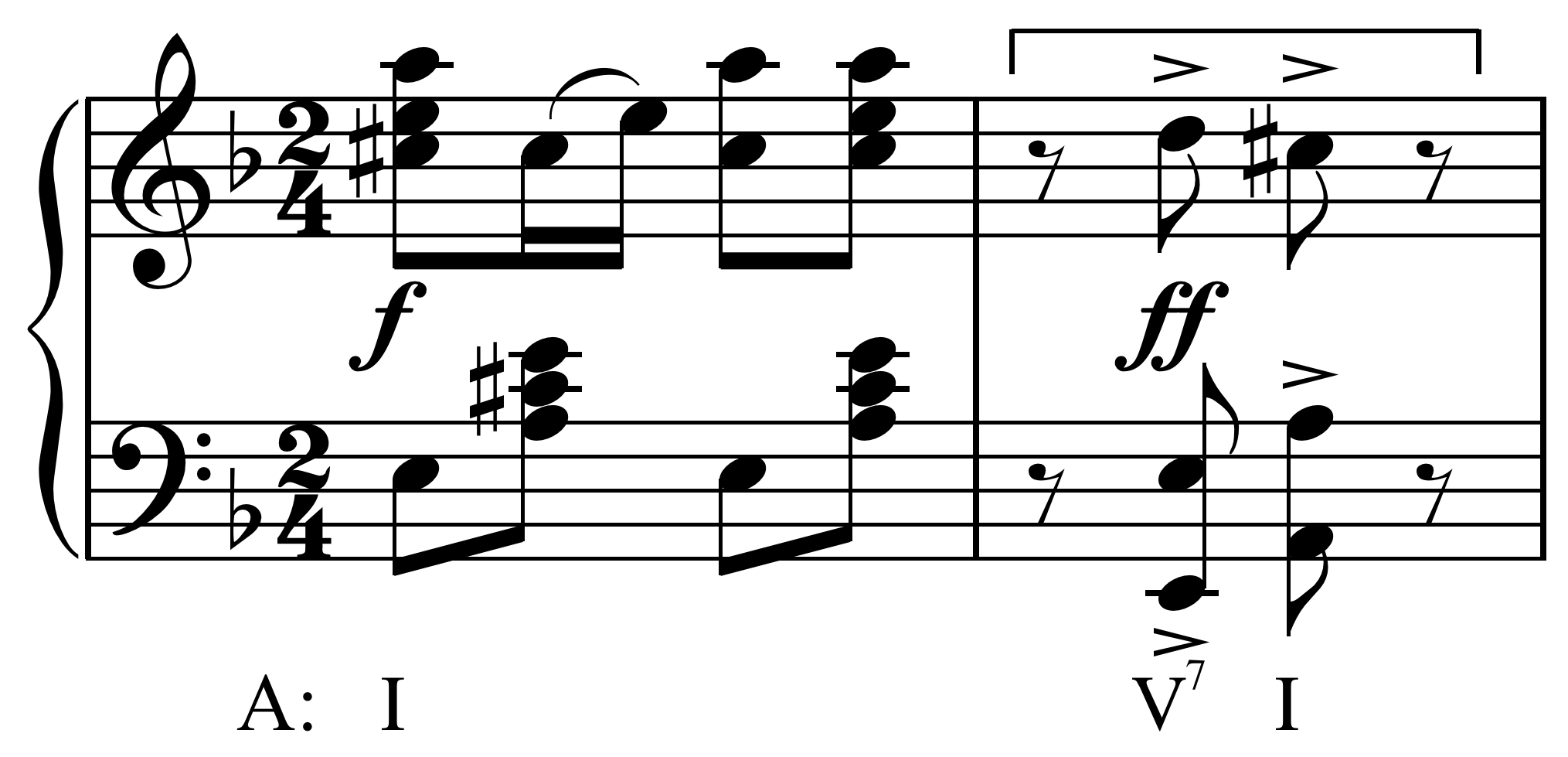
Stop-time in Dan Emmett's "Aunt Dinah's Wedding Dance" (1895)

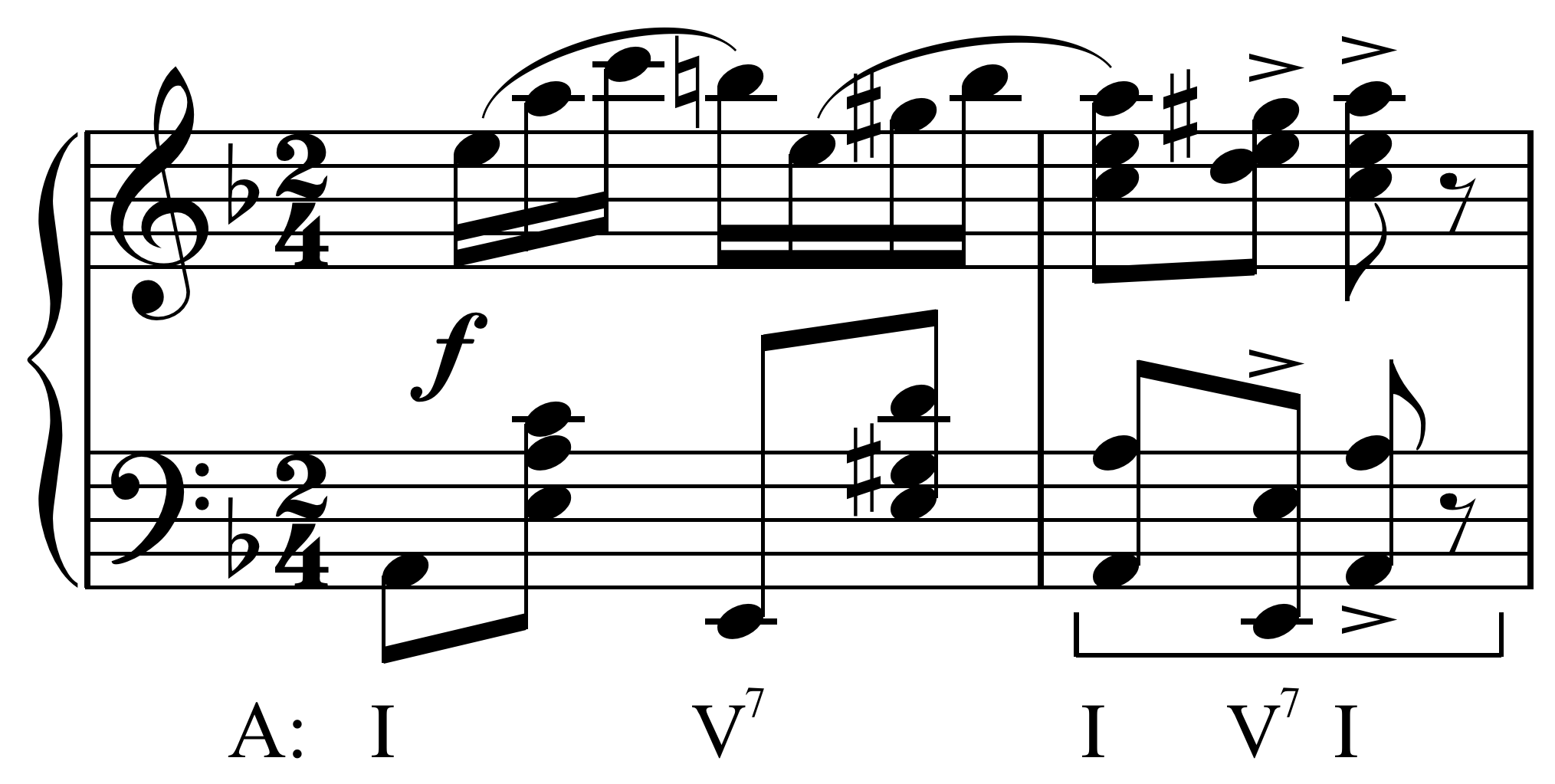
Stop-time in Dan Emmett's "Aunt Dinah's Wedding Dance" (1895)

In tap dancing, jazz, and blues, stop-time is an accompaniment pattern interrupting, or stopping, the normal time and featuring regular accented attacks on the first beat of each or every other measure, alternating with silence or instrumental solos. Stop-time occasionally appears in ragtime music. The characteristics of stop-time are heavy accents, frequent rests, and a stereotyped cadential pattern. Stop-timing may create the impression that the tempo has changed, though it has not, as the soloist continues without accompaniment. Stop-time is common in African-American popular music including R&B, soul music, and led to the development of the break in hip hop.

Stop-time is, according to Samuel A. Floyd Jr., "a musical device in which the forward flow of the music stops, or seems to stop, suspended in a rhythmic unison, while in some cases an improvising instrumentalist or singer continues solo with the forward flow of the meter and tempo. Such stop-time moments are sometimes repeated, creating an illusion of starting and stopping, as, for example, in Scott Joplin's "The Ragtime Dance" and Jelly Roll Morton's "King Porter Stomp"."

Joplin's "Stoptime Rag" (1910) employs stop-time throughout; it even lacks his characteristic four-bar introduction. Stop-time in Joplin's rags is characterized by directions in the music for performers to stomp their foot to the beat. The sheet music for Joplin's "Ragtime Dance" contains the direction, "Notice: to get the desired effect of 'stop time', that the pianist will please stamp the heel of one foot heavily upon the floor at the word 'stamp'. Do not raise the toe from the floor while stamping."

In his copyright submission for "Cornet Chop Suey," Louis Armstrong includes a written stop-time chorus. Allusions to the stop-time chorus of "Cornet Chop Suey" occurs in "Oriental Strut" and "Potato Head Blues." Thomas Brothers cites Armstrong's exposure to the tap-dancing of Bubbles, who improvised dance steps during stop-time choruses, at the Sunset Café as further inspiration for stop-time choruses in his repertoire.

In Signifyin(g), Sanctifyin', and Slam Dunking, Gena Dagel Caponi writes:

In this music [African-American spirituals] the fundamental beat chiefly maintained by the patting of one foot, while the hands clap out intricate and varying rhythmic patterns. It should be understood that the foot is not marking straight time, but what Negroes call 'stop time', or what the books have no better definition for than 'syncopation'. The strong accent or down beat is never lost, but is playfully bandied from hand to foot and from foot to hand.

== See also ==
- Son clave, a cross-rhythm of which stop-time is a simplification
- Time signature
