= Scott Joplin: Piano Rags =

- Cover of the expanded CD reissue (1987)

Studio album by Joshua Rifkin
- Released: November 1970
- Genre: Ragtime
- Length: 32:40
- Label: Nonesuch Records

Piano Rags by Scott Joplin is an album by Joshua Rifkin consisting of ragtime compositions by Scott Joplin, released by Nonesuch Records in 1970. The spine of the original album and various compact disc reissues render the title as Scott Joplin: Piano Rags.

The album is considered to have been the first to reintroduce Joplin's music in the early 1970s and thus contributing to the 1970s revival of Ragtime. It received critical recognition upon its release, and, after several of Joplin's compositions were featured in the 1973 film The Sting, achieved commercial success, becoming Nonesuch Records' first million-selling album.

== Liner notes ==
In the liner notes he wrote for the album, Rifkin provides a brief history of ragtime music, a biographical sketch of Joplin, and a musical analysis of the included compositions. He concludes by saying: "The awakening of interest in black culture and history during the last decade has not yet resurrected Joplin and his contemporaries, who remain barely known beyond a growing coterie of ragtime devotees. Yet it offers a perfect opportunity to discover the beauties of his music and accord him the honor that he deserves."

== Reception ==
The album was released in November 1970. It sold 100,000 copies the first year, and went on to become Nonesuch's first million-selling album. For the first time, record stores found themselves putting ragtime in the classical music section. The Billboard "Best-Selling Classical LPs" chart for 28 September 1974 has this album at #5, Rifkin's follow-up album, Volume II, at #4, and a combined set of both volumes at #3; in total, the two volumes had been on the chart for 64 weeks. At the 14th Annual Grammy Awards, Piano Rags was nominated for Best Album Notes and Best Instrumental Soloist Performance (without orchestra).

In January 1971, Harold C. Schonberg of The New York Times, having just heard the album, wrote a featured Sunday edition article entitled "Scholars, Get Busy on Scott Joplin!" Schonberg's call to action has been described as the catalyst for classical music scholars, the sort of people Joplin had battled all his life, to conclude that Joplin was a genius. In 1979, Alan Rich wrote in New York magazine that, by giving artists like Rifkin the opportunity to put Joplin's music on record, Nonesuch "created, almost alone, the Scott Joplin revival."

== Track listing ==
- Side One
1. "Maple Leaf Rag " (1899) (3:13)
2. "The Entertainer" (1902) (4:58)
3. "The Ragtime Dance" (1906) (3:13)
4. "Gladiolus Rag" (1907) (4:24)
- Side Two
1. "Fig Leaf Rag" (1908) (4:38)
2. "Scott Joplin's New Rag" (1912) (3:07)
3. "Euphonic Sounds" (1909) (3:53)
4. "Magnetic Rag" (1914) (5:11)

== Personnel ==
- Joshua Rifkin – piano and liner notes
- Marc J. Aubort & Joanna Nickrenz – engineering and tape editing (Elite Recordings, Inc.)
- Teresa Sterne – coordinator
- Robert L. Heimall – cover design and art direction
- Saul Lambert – cover art

== Charts ==
Chart (1973)	Peak position
Australia (Kent Music Report)	58

== Reissues ==
Nonesuch reissued the album on CD in 1987. This release features nine additional tracks, which were taken from Rifkin's two subsequent albums of music composed by Joplin.

== Follow-up albums ==
Rifkin recorded two more albums of music composed by Joplin, Piano Rags by Scott Joplin, Volume II (1972) and Piano Rags by Scott Joplin, Volume III (1974), both of which were also released by Nonesuch.

== Sources ==
- LA Times. "Entertainment Awards Database". Los Angeles Times.
- Billboard magazine (1974). "Best Selling Classical LPs". Billboard Magazine (28 September 1974): 61.
- Rich, Alan (1979). "Music". New York (24 December 1979). New York Media LLC: 81.
