= Wall Street Rag =

1909 composition

- by Scott Joplin
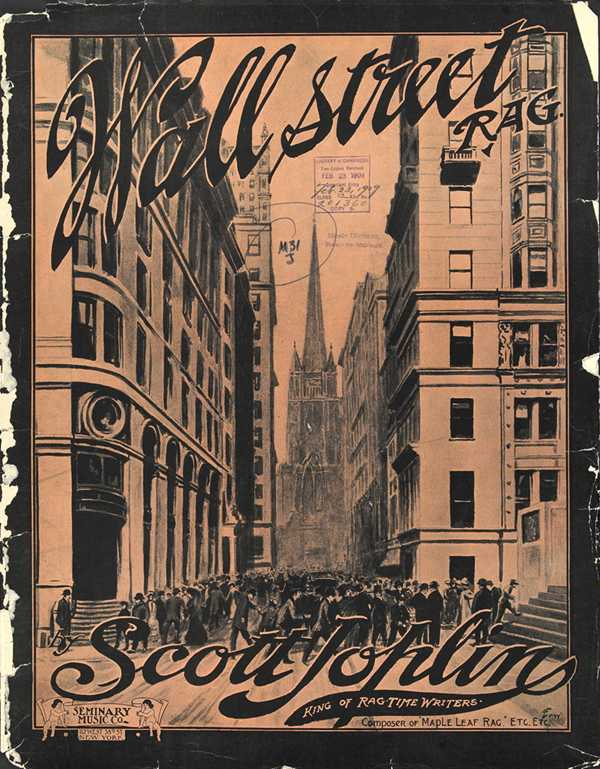
- The 1909 frontal cover of the sheet music looks down towards Trinity Church, and the dark-suited crowd in front of the Stock Exchange.
- Genre: Ragtime
- Form: A Syncopated March and Two Step
- Published: 1909
- Publisher: Seminary Music Co. of New York

"Wall Street Rag" is a ragtime composition by Scott Joplin, first published in 1909. As indicated by the title, the theme is based on Wall Street following the events surrounding the Panic of 1907. This is represented in the musical structure along with its corresponding annotations.

== History ==
External media

Audio
- Scott Joplin, "Wall Street Rag", 1909, performed by Bill Edwards

Video
- Scott Joplin, "Wall Street Rag", 1909

In 1909, the "Wall Street Rag" by Scott Joplin was published. The copyright was registered February 23, 1909 to Seminary Music Co. of New York.

== Musical structure ==
Intro A A B B C C D D

Unlike most of his rags during this time, this composition is based on a major historical event and features footnotes unique to the theme of this piece. Moreover, this arrangement uses a “Very Slow March Time” rather than the “Slow March Time” used in his other compositions. The rag’s opening section begins with notes of Panic in Wall Street, Brokers feeling melancholy, representing the first phase of the recession. The next section of the rag moves from a Chopinesque chromatic style to the right-hand chords and bass octaves of Good times have come, providing an atmosphere of hope within the crisis. The rag finally closes with Listening to the strains of genuine negro ragtime, brokers forget their cares, where the melancholy is all but eradicated by an upbeat ragtime melody.

== Legacy ==
Ragtime scholar John E. Roache praised "Wall Street Rag", calling it "ragtime taken to a higher level."

== See also ==
- List of compositions by Scott Joplin
