= Silver Swan Rag =

1914 composition

The Silver Swan
- by Scott Joplin
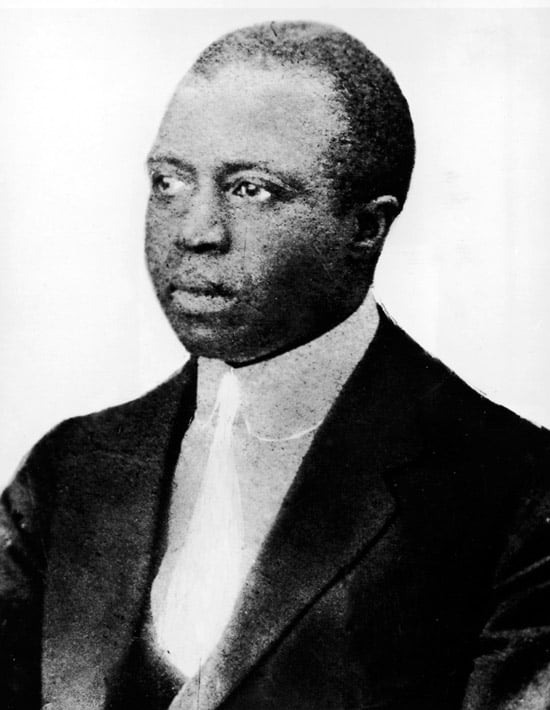
- Joplin in 1912
- Genre: Ragtime
- Form: Rag
- Published: 1971
- Publisher: New York Public Library
- Instrument: Solo piano

"The Silver Swan" by Scott Joplin is a ragtime composition for piano. It is the only known Joplin composition to be originally released on piano roll instead of in musical notation.

== Form ==
The overall structure of the piece is:

Intro AA BB A CC Intro A

The structure is unusual for a Joplin rag; Edwards characterized it as a rondo. The recapitulation of the A strain at the end is also found in "Magnetic Rag" and "Scott Joplin's New Rag", which appeared about the same time.

The introduction and the A strain are both in B♭ major. At the start of the B strain, the piece modulates to G minor. Edwards describes this section as "well developed".

The C strain is in E♭ major. The phrasing is notably uncharacteristic of Joplin rags. While it was typical to repeat the beginning phrase at the halfway point of a strain, or otherwise lead into a different melody that resolves by the sixteenth bar, here it abruptly pauses at the eighth bar before modulating to C minor in the ninth bar. The rhythmic momentum later does not subside on the tonic chord during the first repeat ending of the strain but rather continues as the strain is repeated. The phrasing is then perceived as starting at the ninth bar and ending on the eighth bar through the repeat. Jasen and Tichenor wrote that it "sounds as though it consists of three fragments put together".

== Publication history ==
"Silver Swan Rag" was never copyrighted or published in Joplin's lifetime. Though two companies (QRS Music Roll Company and National) issued piano roll recordings of it in 1914, the piece was neglected for many years.

Interest in Joplin's music revived in the 1960s. In 1970, a copy of the National roll (which did not credit Joplin) was discovered in the garage of a collector. While some doubted its authenticity, the piece was transcribed into musical notation for inclusion in Vera Brodsky Lawrence's The Collected Works of Scott Joplin, published in 1971. The copyright for "Silver Swan Rag" was assigned to the Lottie Joplin Thomas Trust. Later in the 1970s, concerns about the piece's authenticity were allayed by the discovery of the QRS roll, which credited Joplin as the composer.

== See also ==
- List of compositions by Scott Joplin
