= Maple Leaf Rag =

Ragtime composition for piano by Scott Joplin

- by Scott Joplin
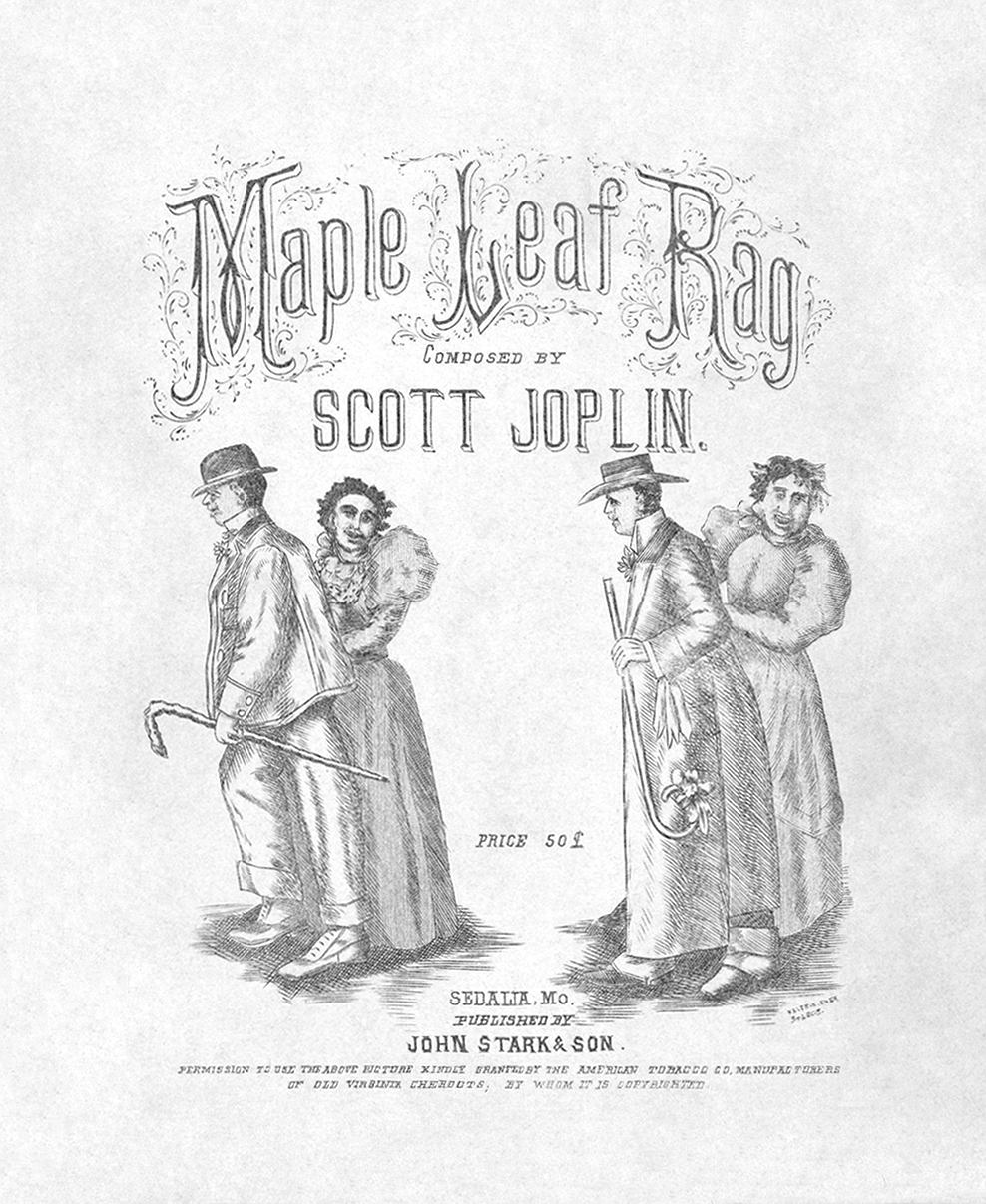
- First-edition cover
- Genre: Ragtime
- Form: Rag
- Published: 1899
- Publisher: John Stark & Son
- "Maple Leaf Rag" "Maple Leaf Rag" performed on a piano

The "Maple Leaf Rag" (copyright registered on September 18, 1899) is an early ragtime musical piece composed for piano by Scott Joplin. It was one of Joplin's early works, becoming the model for ragtime compositions by subsequent composers. It is one of the most famous of all ragtime pieces. Its success led to Joplin being dubbed the "King of Ragtime" by his contemporaries. The piece gave Joplin a steady, modest income for the rest of his life.

Despite ragtime's decline after Joplin's death in 1917, the "Maple Leaf Rag" continued to be recorded by many well-known artists. The ragtime revival of the 1970s brought it back to mainstream public notice.

== Back ==
The "Maple Leaf Rag" is associated with the city of Sedalia, Missouri, although there is no record of Joplin having a permanent residence there before 1904. Joplin arrived in Sedalia in 1894 as a touring musician and stayed with the family of Arthur Marshall, who later became one of Joplin's students and a ragtime composer in his own right. Joplin played as a solo musician at dances and at the major black clubs in Sedalia, among them the "Maple Leaf Club". It is possible that the rag was named after the Maple Leaf Club, although there is no direct evidence to prove the link, and there were probably many other possible sources for the name in and around Sedalia at the time.

Although there were hundreds of rags in print by the time of the "Maple Leaf Rag's" publication, Joplin was not far behind. His first published rag was "Original Rags" (March 1899). The "Maple Leaf Rag" was already known in Sedalia prior to its publication in 1899; composer and pianist Brun Campbell claimed to have seen the manuscript of the work in or around 1898. Prior to its publication, Joplin anticipated that the piece would be a success—he told Arthur Marshall that "The Maple Leaf will make me the king of ragtime composers".

The exact circumstances which led to publication of the "Maple Leaf Rag" are unknown, and there are versions of the event which contradict each other. After approaching several publishers, Joplin signed a contract with John Stillwell Stark on August 10, 1899 for a royalty of one cent ($0.39 in 2025) on all sales of the rag, with a minimum sales price of 25 cents($9.68 in 2025). The "Maple Leaf Rag" was published between August 10 and September 20, 1899, when the United States Copyright Office received two copies of the score. It was reissued in 1900 or 1901 with a new cover showing a green maple leaf and a photograph of Joplin. In 1903, Stark issued a "Maple Leaf Rag Song", an arrangement of Joplin's music with words by Sydney Brown.

== Structure ==
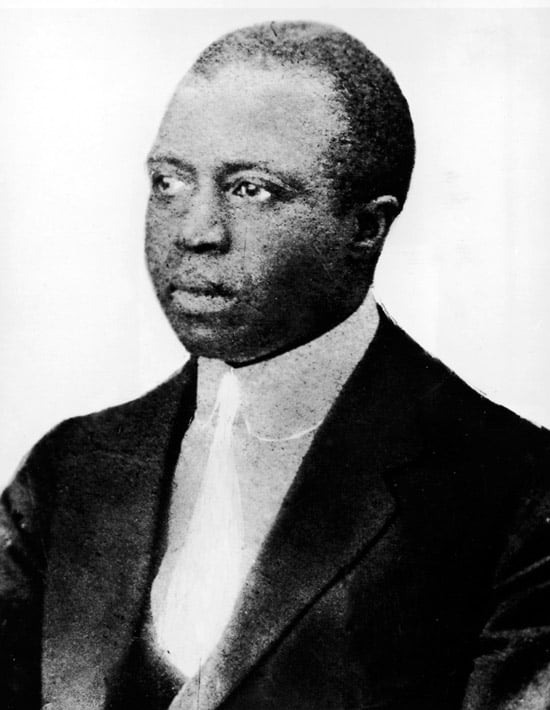
Scott Joplin in 1912

The "Maple Leaf Rag" is a multi-strain ragtime march with athletic bass lines and offbeat melodies. Each of the four parts features a recurring theme and a striding bass line with copious seventh chords. The piece may be considered the "archetypal rag" due to its influence on the genre; its structure was the basis for many other rags, including "Sensation" by Joseph Lamb.

It is more carefully constructed than almost all the previous rags, and the syncopations, especially in the transition between the first and second strain, were novel at the time.

Generally, the "Maple Leaf Rag" is considered moderately difficult to play; a pianist must have very good coordination in the left hand to perform it successfully, particularly for the trio, which involves leaps of two octaves. When it was published, it was considered significantly more difficult than the average Tin Pan Alley and early ragtime sheet music common at the time.

"Gladiolus Rag," a later composition by Joplin, is a developed variant of the "Maple Leaf Rag" showcasing Joplin's increasing musical sophistication, and is usually played at a somewhat slower tempo. In addition, the first strains of Joplin's "The Cascades," "The Sycamore," "Leola," and "Sugar Cane" are modeled on the structure Joplin created for the first strain of "Maple Leaf Rag."

The composition starts in the key of A♭ major and changes to D♭ major during the first part of the trio, then modulates back to A♭ major.

== Lyrics ==
In 1903, Stark issued a "Maple Leaf Rag Song", an arrangement of Joplin's music with words by Sydney Brown. Brown's lyrics tell the story of a poor man from Accomack County, Virginia, who stumbles into a ballroom where, in spite of his anxiety over the state of his appearance, he manages to wow the crowd with the Maple Leaf Rag. While the men are jealous of his dancing abilities and draw their razors, the women love him, and the "finest belle" sends for a carriage and the two of them ride away.

Modern ragtime composer Ron O'Dell has commented that the song has characteristics in common with rap, such as the lyrical themes, the lyrics being written in the African American Vernacular English of the time, and the fact that the lyrics are sung over the least melodic strain of the music.

== Popularity and legacy ==
A 1906 recording of the Maple Leaf Rag by the United States Marine Band. This is the first surviving recording of the Maple Leaf Rag

"Maple Leaf Rag" – played by Scott Joplin (June 1916)
A June 1916 Piano Roll recording of Scott Joplin for The Aeolian Company.

There have been many claims about the sales of the "Maple Leaf Rag", for example that 1 million copies of the sheet music were sold in the composer's lifetime, making Scott Joplin the first musician to sell 1 million copies of a piece of instrumental music. Joplin's first biographer Rudi Blesh wrote that during its first six months the piece sold 75,000 copies, and became "the first great instrumental sheet music hit in America". However, research by Joplin's later biographer Edward A. Berlin demonstrated that this was not the case; the initial print-run of 400 took one year to sell, and under the terms of Joplin's contract with a one-cent royalty would have given Joplin an income of $4, or approximately $150 in 2025. Later sales were steady and would have given Joplin an income which would have covered his expenses; in 1909 estimated sales would have given him an income of $600 annually (approximately $21,000 in 2025).

In addition to sales of sheet music, it was also popular in orchestrations for dance bands and brass bands for years. Joplin failed to repeat the success of Maple Leaf Rag, with none of his other famous rags (such as "The Entertainer") garnering as much popularity as the Maple Leaf Rag did. The royalties earned by the sheet music sales did provide Joplin with a steady income for the rest of his life, however.

Soon after the publication of the "Maple Leaf Rag", the earliest recordings of the rag took place; band leader Wilbur Sweatman recorded it onto phonograph cylinder a year later, but there are no known copies which have survived. The earliest surviving record of the rag comes from the second known recording of the rag by the United States Marine Band from 1906.

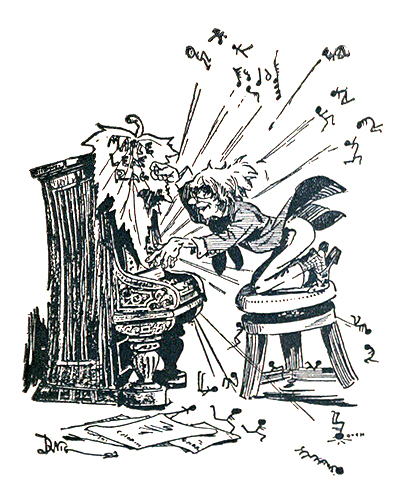
Cartoon of a man playing Joplin's Maple Leaf Rag

While Joplin never made an audio recording, his playing is preserved on seven piano rolls for use in mechanical player pianos. All seven were made in 1916. Berlin theorizes that by the time Joplin made these recordings he may have been experiencing discoordination of the fingers, tremors and an inability to speak clearly, symptoms of syphilis, the disease that took his life in 1917. The recording of "Maple Leaf Rag", on the Aeolian Uni-Record label from June 1916 was described by biographer Blesh as "shocking ... disorganized and completely distressing to hear". Berlin notes that the "Maple Leaf Rag" roll was "painfully bad" and likely to be the truest record of Joplin's playing at the time. The roll, however, does not reflect his abilities earlier in life.

The piece was a selection in the White Star Line songbook in the early 1900s, and could have possibly been played aboard the RMS Titanic during its ill-fated maiden voyage in 1912.

The tune continued to be in the repertoire of jazz bands decades later, with artists such as the New Orleans Rhythm Kings in the 1920s, and Sidney Bechet in the 1930s giving it up-to-date adaptations, maintaining a timeless quality to it. As an indication of its persistent popularity and recognition, it was performed on phonograph records six times in each of the three decades after its first publication. In 1930, it was featured in the gangster movie classic, The Public Enemy. "Maple Leaf Rag" was the Joplin piece found most often on 78 rpm records.

In November 1970, Joshua Rifkin released a recording called Scott Joplin: Piano Rags on the classical label Nonesuch, which featured as its first track the "Maple Leaf Rag". It sold 100,000 copies in its first year and eventually became Nonesuch's first million-selling record. The Billboard "Best-Selling Classical LPs" chart for September 28, 1974 has the record at number 5, with the follow-up "Volume 2" at number 4, and a combined set of both volumes at number 3. Separately both volumes had been on the chart for 64 weeks. The album was nominated in 1971 for two Grammy Award categories: Best Album Notes and Best Instrumental Soloist Performance (without orchestra), but at the ceremony on March 14, 1972, Rifkin did not win in any category. In 1979 Alan Rich in New York magazine wrote that by giving artists like Rifkin the opportunity to put Joplin's music on disk Nonesuch Records "created, almost alone, the Scott Joplin revival."

An 8-bit version of the music is used in the 1983 Bally Midway arcade game Domino Man as background music.

The "Maple Leaf Rag" is still a favorite of ragtime pianists, and has been described as an "American institution ... still in print and still popular". As the copyright has expired, the composition is in the public domain. It appears in the soundtracks of hundreds of films, cartoons, commercials, and video games. In 2004, Canadian radio listeners voted it the 39th greatest song of all time.

"Maple Leaf Rag" was featured as one of the piano exam pieces in Grade 8 for the years 2025 and 2026, by the Associated Board of the Royal Schools of Music (ABRSM).

In Joplin's will, he requested that "Maple Leaf Rag" be played at his funeral, but when preparations were being made, his wife, Lottie Stokes, did not allow it because she did not think it was a proper funeral song. She later admitted regretting that decision her whole life.

== See also ==
- List of compositions by Scott Joplin

== Sources ==
- Berlin, Edward A. (1994). King of Ragtime: Scott Joplin and His Era. Oxford Univ. Press. ISBN 0-19-510108-1.
- Blesh, Rudi; Janis, Harriet (1971). They All Played Ragtime. New York: Oak Publications. ISBN 978-0-8256-0091-3.
- Blesh, Rudi (1981). "Scott Joplin: Black-American Classicist". In Lawrence, Vera Brodsky (ed.). Scott Joplin Complete Piano Works. New York Public Library. ISBN 0-87104-272-X.
- Benward, Bruce; Saker, Marilyn (2003). Music: In Theory and Practice. Vol. I (7th ed.). McGraw-Hill College. p. 203. ISBN 978-0-07-294262-0.
- Jasen, David A.; Tichenor, Trebor Jay (1978). Rags and Ragtime: A Musical History. New York, NY: Dover Publications, Inc. p. 88. ISBN 0-486-25922-6.
- Jasen, David A. (1981). "Discography of 78 rpm Records of Joplin Works". In Lawrence, Vera Brodsky (ed.). Scott Joplin Complete Piano Works. New York Public Library. ISBN 0-87104-272-X.
- CBC Radio (2004). "Essential Songs of the 20th Century". Archived from the original on October 9, 2004.
- Edwards, "Perfessor" Bill (2008). "Rags & Pieces by Scott Joplin, 1895 - 1905". Archived from the original on June 6, 2009.
- Edwards, "Perfessor" Bill (2010). ""Perfessor" Bill's guide to notable Ragtime Era Composers". Archived from the original on September 27, 2011.
- RedHotJazz. "Wilbur Sweatman and His Band". Archived from the original on June 21, 2013.
- LA Times. "Entertainment Awards Database". Los Angeles Times.
- Billboard magazine (1974). "Best Selling Classical LPs". Billboard Magazine (September 28, 1974): 61.
- Rich, Alan (1979). "Music". New York (December 24, 1979). New York Media LLC: 81.
