= Charles N. Daniels (music) =

American songwriter (1878–1943)

- Also known as: Neil Moret, Jules Lemare, L'Albert, Paul Bertrand, Julian Strauss, Sidney Carter
- Born: Charles N. Daniels; April 12, 1878
- Origin: Leavenworth, Kansas, U.S.
- Died: January 23, 1943 (aged 64)
- Occupations: Composer, lyricist

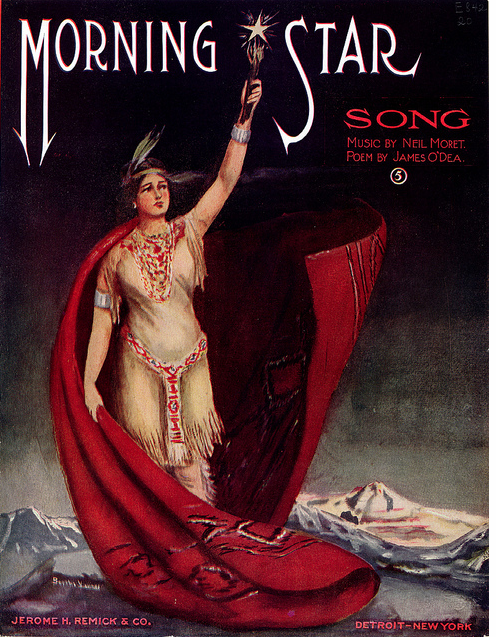
Cover of "Morning Star" sheet music by Neil Moret (alias of Charles N. Daniels)

Charles N. Daniels (April 12, 1878 – January 23, 1943) was a composer, occasional lyricist, and music publishing executive. He employed many pseudonyms, including Neil Moret, Jules Lemare, L'Albert, Paul Bertrand, Julian Strauss, and Sidney Carter. His creative work is generally credited as "Moret" while his business dealings and ASCAP membership were under the name Daniels.

== Biography ==
Daniels was born in Leavenworth, Kansas, and brought up in Saint Joseph and Kansas City, Missouri. At 18 he won a prize for his composition "Margery", which was performed by John Philip Sousa's band.

By 1899, Daniels was such a celebrity that when Carl Hoffman published the sheet music for Scott Joplin's "Original Rags," he made a point to credit Daniels as the arranger. It's not known if Daniels actually arranged the piece or merely transcribed it.

In 1904 he started the Daniels and Russel publishing firm in Saint Louis, later forming his own firm and working as an executive with Jerome H. Remick & Co.

In 1928 he wrote the music for the song "She's Funny That Way", to words that Richard A. Whiting—normally a composer himself—wrote as a gift to his wife. This was recorded by a number of singers, including Margaret Whiting, Richard's daughter.

He also composed "Chloe (Song of the Swamp)" (1927; words by Gus Kahn), "Moonlight and Roses Bring Mem'ries of You" (1925; words and music Moret and Ben Black, but based upon an organ composition by Edwin H. Lemare), and did both words and music for "Song of the Wanderer" (1926).

Under his real name Daniels published "You Tell Me Your Dream, I'll Tell You Mine" with A. H. Brown and Seymour Rice in 1899. A version of the song with lyrics by Gus Kahn was copyrighted by Villa Moret Music Publishers (another of Daniels' publishing enterprises) in 1928. The song has been recorded hundreds of times, notable recordings including the Mills Brothers in 1931, the Eureka Brass Band in 1951, Connie Francis in 1961, as well as versions by Bing Crosby and the Ink Spots. The Kirby Stone Four recorded a counterpoint arrangement of it in 1959 under the title "The I Had a Dream Dear Rock".

A definitive biography of him has been written by his niece, Nan Bostick.
