= Classic rag =

Music style of ragtime composition

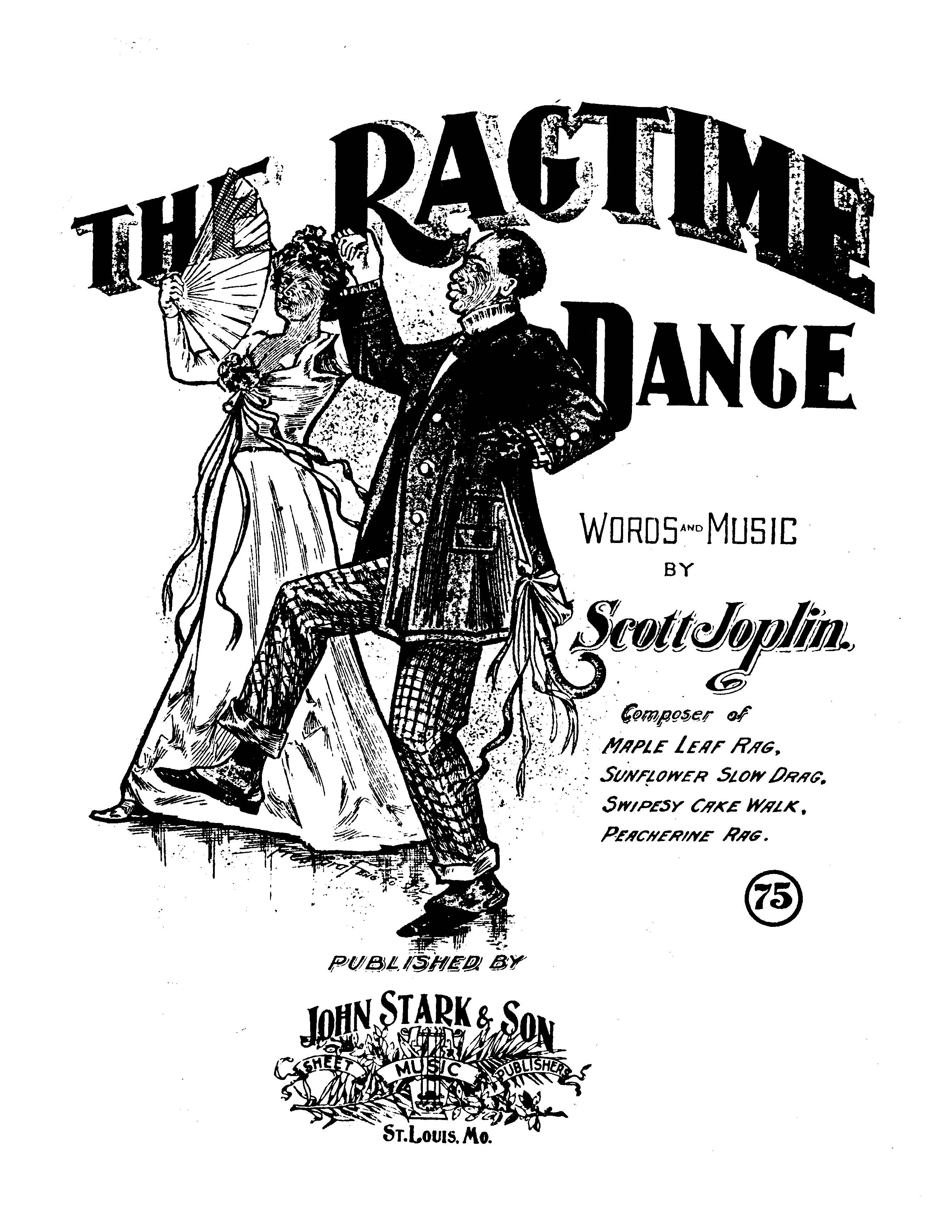
Cover of Scott Joplin's "The Ragtime Dance"

Classic rag (short for classical ragtime) is the style of ragtime composition pioneered by Scott Joplin and the Missouri school of ragtime composers. These compositions were first considered "classic" by Joplin's publisher, John Stark, as a way to distinguish them from what he considered the "common" rags of other publishers. Today, any composition fitting this particular ragtime structural form is considered classic rag.

In the earliest days of ragtime, there was little consensus on how to print the syncopated melodies of ragtime, so there was considerable variety in the formatting of sheet music. Pieces appeared in common meter, in 4/4 time, and in 2/4 time, and often followed conventions of earlier musical forms such as the march. As the 20th century dawned, most composers, arrangers, and publishers began to settle on a common set of notational and structural conventions, and because Scott Joplin was the best-selling ragtime composer in that era, his conventions eventually predominated. The "classic rag" form can thus be considered a typical form of a ragtime piano composition, though it is by no means the only form.

== Anatomy ==
In idealized form, the classic rag has the following structure:

- It is set in 2/4 time.
- It starts with a four-bar introduction.
- It continues with a pair of 16-bar themes, in the following sequence:
  - An initial theme (or A strain).
  - A repeat of the A strain.
  - A second theme (or B strain).
  - A repeat of the B strain.
  - A restatement of the A strain.
- It concludes with a pair of 16-bar themes in the subdominant key (the key with one additional flat, or one less sharp), commonly called the trio, in the following sequence:
  - A third theme (or C strain).
  - A repeat of the C strain.
  - A fourth theme (or D strain).
  - A repeat of the D strain.

This can be written more succinctly as: INTRO AA BB A CC DD.

Few classic rags follow this idealized form, which is only a generalization; there are a number of standard variations:

- The introduction may be longer or shorter than four bars, or may be omitted altogether.
- The C and D strains may continue in the original key rather than use the subdominant key.
- The D strain may return to the original key rather than stay in the subdominant key.
- The D strain may be omitted altogether, or replaced with a restatement of the A or B strain.
- Some repetitions of strains may be omitted, usually one of the repeats of the A strain.
- Brief transitional phrases may be inserted between strains.

In the later years of ragtime, under the influence of Tin Pan Alley, a shorter three-strain form (omitting the D strain) became common.

== Anatomy of a rag strain ==
Rag strains themselves have considerable structure. The treble clef (played by the right hand) typically contains the syncopated melodic theme, while the bass clef (the left-hand part) grounds this theme rhythmically with a regular, alternating pattern of eighth-notes (a walking bass).

The sixteen-bar strain is often structurally divided into 4 four-bar phrases, the third phrase repeating the first. There is considerable variation, though. Some composers (such as James Scott) made frequent use of two-bar phrases and others (such as Joseph Lamb) tended to employ eight-bar phrases.
