= Two-step (dance move) =

Dance move

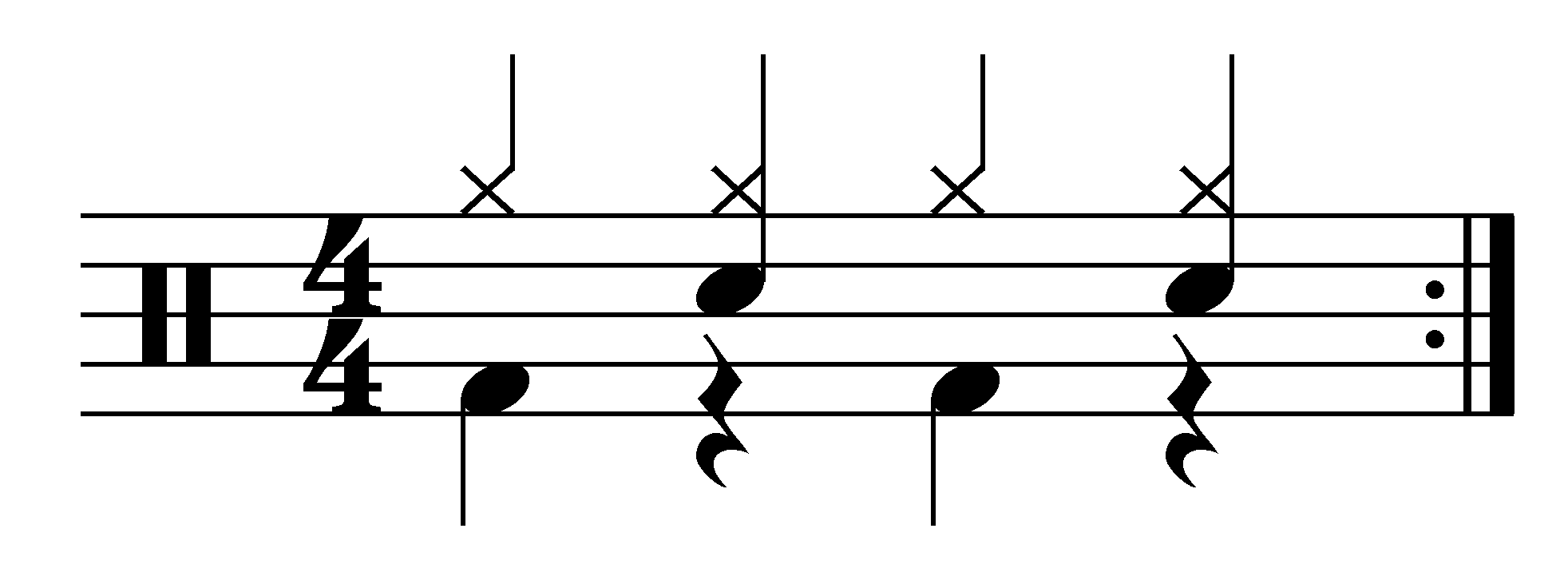
Drum pattern associated with the two-step.

The two-step is a step found in various dances, including many folk dances.

A two-step consists of two steps in approximately the same direction onto the same foot, separated by a joining or uniting step with the other foot. For example, a right two-step forward is a forward step onto the right foot, a closing step with the left foot, and a forward step onto the right foot. The closing step may be done directly beside the other foot, or obliquely beside, or even crossed, as long as the closing foot does not go past the other foot.

The two-step is often confused with the country/western two-step. "The Texas Shuffle step was formerly called a foxtrot step and has erroneously been called Texas Two-Step. This error causes confusion because this dance is entirely different from the real two-step as danced in the forward-moving section of Cotton-Eyed Joe, Cowboy Polka (Jessie Polka), and other dances." "There are really two histories of what is called 'two step dance,' because the name jumped from one type of dance that is no longer done to another that is done, called the Texas Two-step or collegiate Fox-trot. The original Two-step was a simple dance that first caught on with the public when John Philip Sousa came out with the 'Washington Post March' in 1889."

== Europe ==
In Europe the two-step became popular from around 1900 until the 1910s, when the one-step and the foxtrot took over. Other examples of two-step marches include Louis Conterno's Red Clouds March Two Step and Nellie Beamish's Thirteenth National Regiment March and Two Step.

== See also ==
- Triple step
- Lock step
- Dance move
- One-step
- Foxtrot
