= Alan Rich =

American music critic

- Born: June 17, 1924; Boston, Massachusetts
- Died: West Los Angeles, California
- Education: Harvard University
- Occupations: Music critic, author
- Notable work: Music: Mirror of the Arts (1969); So I've Heard: Notes of a Migratory Music Critic (2006); Play by Play series

Alan Rich (June 17, 1924 – April 23, 2010) was an American music critic who served on the staff of many newspapers and magazines on both coasts. Originally from Brookline, Massachusetts, he first studied medicine at Harvard University before turning to music. While a student at Harvard he began his career as critic, working as assistant music critic at the Boston Herald.

He was music director of KPFA, the Berkeley radio station, and successively a music critic for publications including The New York Times, the New York Herald Tribune, New York magazine, Newsweek, California magazine, the Los Angeles Herald-Examiner, Opera News, and from 1992 to 2008 LA Weekly magazine. He subsequently worked briefly as music critic for Bloomberg News.

Rich also wrote a number of books including Music, Mirror of the Arts (1969) and So I've Heard: Notes of a Migratory Music Critic, published in 2006.

In 1990, Rich authored an innovative CD-ROM exploring Schubert's "Trout Quintet". Published by The Voyager Company, and produced by composer David Javelosa.

== Early life ==
Rich was born on June 17, 1924, in Boston, Massachusetts. He earned a master's degree from the University of California, Berkeley, in 1952. He initially studied pre-med at Harvard University, graduating in 1945. He shifted his focus to music after encountering Donald Tovey's ''Essays in Musical Analysis'', which inspired him with its lively, imaginative approach to describing music.

== Personal life ==
He dies of natural causes in his sleep on April 23, 2010 West Los Angeles.

== Bibliography ==
- Careers and Opportunities in Music (1964)
- Music: Mirror of the Arts (1969)
- The Simon & Schuster Listener’s Guide to Opera (1980)
- The Lincoln Center Story (1984)
- American Pioneers: Ives to Cage and Beyond (1995)
- Play by Play series (1995)

== See also ==
- List of chief music critics
- Music criticism
- Classical music of the United States
