= John Stillwell Stark =

American music publisher (1841–1927)

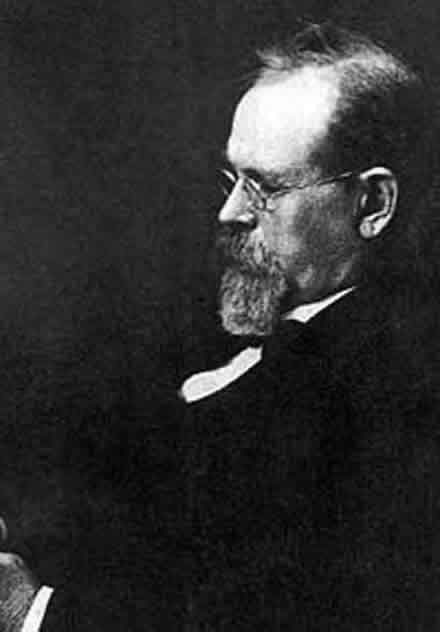
- John Stillwell Stark
- Born: John Stillwell Stark; April 11, 1841; Kentucky, U.S.
- Died: October 21, 1927 (aged 86); St. Louis, Missouri, U.S.
- Other name: John Stark
- Occupation: Music publisher
- Known for: Work with Scott Joplin
- Spouse: Sarah Ann Casey (wife)
- Relatives: Adin Stark (father); Eleanor Stillwell Stark (mother); Etilman J. Stark (brother); William Stark (son); E.J. Stark (son); Eleanor Stark (daughter)
- Military career
- Allegiance: United States
- Branch: Union Army
- Rank: Bugler
- Conflicts: American Civil War

John Stillwell Stark (April 11, 1841 – October 21, 1927) (Note: The commonly-seen date in print and on the web of November 20, 1927, is erroneous, as his death certificate, online here, clearly indicates a date of death of October 21, and burial on October 23, 1927.) was an American publisher of ragtime music, best known for publishing and promoting the music of Scott Joplin.

== Early life and education ==
Stark

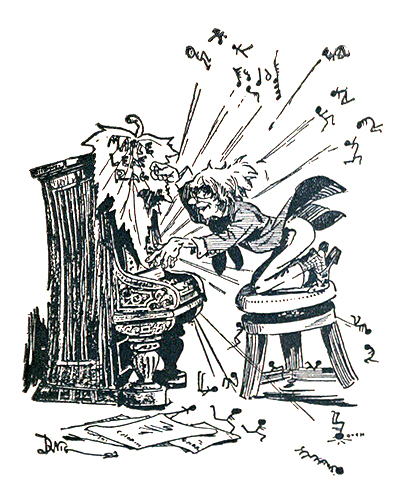
An advertisement for Scott Joplin's "Maple Leaf Rag" from the back page of a rag by Joseph Lamb. Both published with Stark's firm.

Stark was the eleventh of 12 children born to Adin Stark and Eleanor Stillwell Stark of Shelby County, Kentucky. He grew up on a farm in Bean Blossom, Indiana, (Note: John Stark is found living with his older brother Etilman J. Stark in both the 1850 and 1860 Census taken at Bean Blossom, incorrectly listed as John S. Starks in the 1860 record.) and served in the Union Army during the American Civil War, where he played the bugle. He married Sarah Ann Casey and raised a family, earning his living as a farmer, first in Indiana and then in Missouri near Maysville. His children included E.J. Stark, who became a well-known composer of ragtime, and Eleanor, who was a talented musician. Eventually John Stark tired of farming and moved to Cameron, where he went into the new business of ice-cream making. After moving to Chillicothe, he supplemented his income by selling organs and pianos.

== Career ==
In 1885, Stark settled in Sedalia, Missouri, and entered the music business full-time, opening an office at 516 Ohio Street and founding John Stark and Son with his 15-year-old son William. He got into the publishing business after buying out J.W. Truxel, one of his competitors, who owned seven copyrights.

It was in Sedalia that Stark heard Scott Joplin play the "Maple Leaf Rag", and on August 10, 1899, he bought the number for $50 plus royalties of one cent per copy. It proved a prosperous arrangement for both men. After an initial printing of 5,000 copies, a million were eventually sold, which enabled Stark to open an office in St. Louis, Missouri (and, in 1905, New York City) and Joplin to engage in composing for a living. Over the next two decades, Stark published and promoted the "classic" style rag pioneered by Joplin and other composers, including Joseph Lamb, James Scott, Arthur Marshall, Paul Pratt, Artie Matthews, Robert Hampton, J. Russel Robinson, and his son Etilmon Justus Stark.

Stark also self-published several of his own works, such as 'We are Coming, Uncle Sammy (1917, music by E.J Stark), 'The Vital Question' (1913, text by E.J Stark), and 'He's all Shot to Pieces by the French Girls' Eyes' (1917).

== Later life and death ==
After his wife died in 1910, Stark closed his New York office and returned to St. Louis. By this time New York's Tin Pan Alley was dominating ragtime music sales. He continued to publish new rags until 1922, well after ragtime had succumbed to jazz, which Stark loathed. Stark died in St. Louis on October 21, 1927.

== Legacy ==
He is portrayed by Art Carney in the 1977 film, Scott Joplin.
