= 1906 in music =

This is a list of notable events in music that took place in the year 1906.

== Specific locations ==
- 1906 in Norwegian music

== Events ==
- January 8 – Pianist Arthur Rubinstein plays Camille Saint-Saens' Piano concerto No. 2 at his New York debut.
- January 15 – Excerpts from Arthur Nevin's opera Poia are premiered in concert form by the Pittsburgh Symphony Orchestra.
- January 17 – Felix Weingartner makes his Boston debut conducting the New York Symphony Orchestra in program that includes Symphonie fantastique by Hector Berlioz.
- January 21 – Georges Enesco's Symphony No.1 in E-flat Major premieres in Paris. The work has three movements.
- January 27 – Ernest Bloch's symphonic work Hiver-Printemps premieres in Geneva, the composer conducting.
- January 27 – Russian pianist Josef Lhevinne makes his American debut with the Russian Symphony Orchestra, conducted by Vasily Safonov in New York.
- February 6 – Karol Szymanowski's Concert Overture in E major (Uwertura koncertowa E-dur) premiered by Gregor Fitelberg in Warsaw.
- February 18 – Vincent d'Indy's symphonic work Jour d'été à la montagne premieres at a Colonne concert in Paris.
- February – Abyssinia receives its premiere at the Majestic Theatre (Broadway) in New York City, with a score co-written by Bert Williams, including the premiere of the song "Nobody".
- March 7 – Ernst von Dohnányi's Concerto for Cello and Orchestra premieres with Hugo Becker as soloist and the composer conducting Budapest Philharmonic Orchestra.
- March 10 – Don Procopio, an opera buffa written by Georges Bizet, is premiered posthumously at the Theatre du Casino, Monte Carlo.The two-act opera, written during Bizet's student days, had not been discovered until 30 years later.
- March 19 – The premiere of the opera I quattro rusteghi (or Die Vier Grobiane), by Ermanno Wolf-Ferrari, takes place at the Hoftheater in Munich. The libretto, by Giuseppe Pizzolato, is based on a popular play of the same name by Carlo Goldoni.
- March 27 – John Philip Sousa's comic opera The Free Lance receives its initial performance in Springfield, Massachusetts.
- April 2 – Mayor Eugene Schmitz of San Francisco gives a lavish dinner party for the purpose of raising money to build a new opera house. Violinist Jan Kubelik is the guest of honor.
- April 8 – Vincenzo Tommasini's opera Medea premieres at the Teatro Verdi in Trieste. The libretto, written by the composer, is based on the Greek myth of Medea.
- April 18 – The catastrophic San Francisco earthquake occurs. The Grand Opera house, where Enrico Caruso performed last night, is destroyed by fire. Costumes and scenery of twelve operas go up in smoke, resulting in a loss of $120,000.
- May 24 – The choral rhapsody for baritone solo, chorus and orchestra Sea Drift by Frederick Delius is performed for the first time at the music festival in Essen, Germany.
- May 27 – Gustav Mahler's Symphony No. 6 in A Minor receives its premiere at the Saalbau Essen in Germany conducted by the composer.
- May 29 – The University of Oxford in England awards an honorary Doctor of Music degree to Edvard Grieg.
- June 20 – Anton von Webern's doctoral dissertation is approved by his doctoral advisors at the Musicological Institute of the University of Vienna.
- July – The first console gramophone is released, known as Victrola, a horn-enclosed phonograph, manufactured by Victor in the United States.
- July 25 – Percy Grainger arrives at Brigg to start a 10-day tour of Lincolnshire making the first recordings of traditional singers of English folk music onto phonograph cylinders using an Edison machine. The following day he records Dean Robinson singing songs including "As I Walked Out One May Morning" and versions of "Turpin Hero" and "Seventeen Come Sunday".
- August 23 – Norfolk Rhapsody No.1 in E Minor receives its first performance at a Promenade Concert in London. The work of Ralph Vaughan Williams, it is based on Norfolk folk tunes.
- October 15 – Giacomo Puccini's Madama Butterfly receives its first American performance when the Henry W. Savage Opera Company performs the opera in Washington D.C.
- October 31 – Jules Massenet's Ariane has its premiere at the Paris Opera. The libretto, by Catulle Mendes, is based on the Greek myth of Ariane.
- October 27 – Enrique Granados's zarzuela Gaziel is produced in Barcelona.
- November 11 – Opera premieres:
  - Strandrecht (The Wreckers), by English composer Ethel Smyth, premieres in Leipzig, at the Königliches Opernhause.
  - Maskarade, a three-act opera by Carl Nielsen, receives its first performance in Copenhagen, the composer conducting.
- November 16 – In what becomes known as "monkey-house scandal", Enrico Caruso is arrested by a New York City officer on a charge of making improper advances to a passer-by, Mrs Hannah Stanhope. The police accuse him of pinching the buttocks of a married woman. The scandal threatens to reduce sales at the Metropolitan Opera box office, where Caruso sings.
- November 26 – Geraldine Farrar makes her Metropolitan Opera debut as Juliette in Charles Gounod's Romeo et Juliette.
- November 28 – Enrico Caruso sings Rodolfo in La Boheme by Giacomo Puccini in New York City. This is his first appearance after having been arrested, convicted and fined for making improper advances to a woman in Central Park. He virtually brings down the house, the "monkey-house scandal" is quickly forgotten and Caruso's stature remains unaffected.
- December 1 – The celebrated soprano Adelina Patti gives her farewell concert at the Royal Albert Hall in London.
- December 3 – Impresario Oscar Hammerstein opens the Manhattan Opera House to compete with the Metropolitan Opera in New York City. The first presentation is Vincenzo Bellini's I Puritani.
- December 8 – Moloch, an opera by Max von Schillings, receives its first performance in Dresden.
- December 9 – Richard Strauss' opera Salome receives its first Berlin performance. It stars Emmy Destinn and is so successful that, over next 27 years, it is performed 285 times in Berlin alone.
- December 11 – The Melbourne Symphony Orchestra plays its first concert, the oldest continuously active professional orchestra in Australia.
- December 22 – Alexander Glazunov's Symphony No.8 in E-flat Major premieres in Saint Petersburg, the composer conducting. This four-movement symphony is his last.
- December 26 – Italian coloratura soprano Amelita Galli-Curci makes her operatic debut at Trani, as Gilda in Verdi's Rigoletto.
- December 27
  - Matteo Falcone, a dramatic scene by Cesar Cui, is performed for the first time in Moscow. The operatic work is based on a novella by Prosper Merimee about Corsicans.
  - Florent Schmitt's Psalm XLVII premieres at the a Paris concert of music by winners of the Prix de Rome.
- December 29 – Jean Sibelius's symphonic tone poem Pohjola's Daughter premieres in Saint Petersburg, the composer conducting.
- unknown dates
  - Approximate start of Yue opera.
  - Last full-scale court performance of gambuh dance-drama with gamelan ensemble in Bali.
  - Nicholas Laucella joins the New York Philharmonic under the direction of Gustav Mahler.
  - Vassily Safonov becomes then new music director of the New York Philharmonics Society, after a three-year period during which guest conductors led this orchestra.

== Published popular music ==
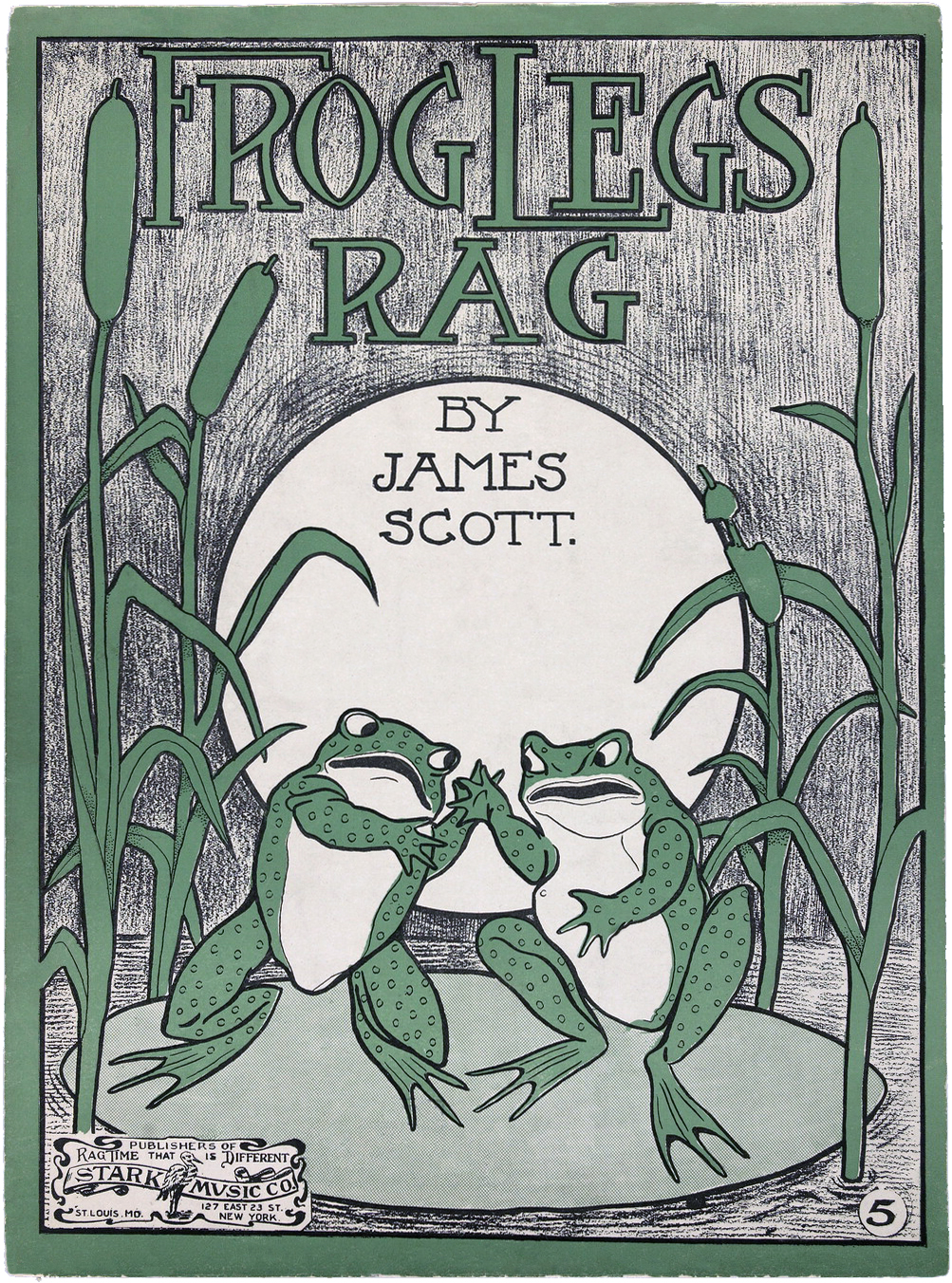
"Frog Legs Rag" by James Scott.

- "Abraham Jefferson Washington Lee" Harry Von Tilzer
- "Ain't You Coming Back To Old New Hampshire, Molly?" w. Robert F. Roden m. J. Fred Helf
- "Alice, Where Art Thou Going?" Heelan, Gumble
- "All In Down And Out" w. Cecil Mack m. Chris Smith, Billy B. Smith & Elmer Bowman
- "Anchors Aweigh" w. Alfred Hart Miles & R. Lovell m. Charles A. Zimmerman
- "Are You Coming Out Tonight, Mary Ann?" w. Andrew B. Sterling m. Harry Von Tilzer
- "Arrah Wanna" w. Jack Drislane m. Theodore F. Morse
- "Because You're You" w. Henry Blossom m. Victor Herbert
- "The Buffalo Rag" Tom Turpin
- "Cheyenne" w. Harry H. Williams m. Egbert Van Alstyne
- "Colleen Bawn" w. Edward Madden m. J. Fred Helf
- "Come, Take A Skate With Me" w.m. Raymond Brown & Gus Edwards
- "Dreaming" w. L. W. Heiser m. J. Anton Dailey
- "Every Day Is Ladies' Day To Me" w. Henry Blossom m. Victor Herbert
- "The Free Lance March" m. John Philip Sousa
- "Frog Legs Rag" m. James Scott
- "The Galloping Major" w. Fred W. Leigh m. George Bastow
- "The Grand Old Rag" (aka "You're a Grand Old Flag") w.m. George M. Cohan
- "He Walked Right In Turned Around And Walked Right Out Again" w. Edward Rose m. Maxwell Silver
- "He's A Cousin Of Mine" w. Cecil Mack m. Chris Smith & Silvio Hein
- "Highland Birthday Party" w.m. Hector Grant
- "Holding Hands (You Don't Say Nothing At All)" w. Jack Norworth m. Albert Von Tilzer
- "I Just Can't Make My Eyes Behave" w.m. Will D. Cobb & Gus Edwards
- "I Miss You In A Thousand Different Ways" w. Will D. Cobb m. Gus Edwards
- "I Never Saw Such Jealousy In My Life" w. Andrew B. Sterling m. Harry Von Tilzer
- "I Was Born In Virginia" w.m. George M. Cohan
- "Ida-Ho!" Von Tilzer
- "If Anybody Wants To Meet A Jonah Shake Hands With Me" w.m. Harry Hoyt
- "I'm Sorry" Von Tilzer
- "I'm Wise" w. Harry Williams m. Egbert van Alstyne
- "In Old New York" w. Henry Blossom m. Victor Herbert
- "Is It Warm Enough For You?" Paley
- "I've Said My Last Farewell" Sischer
- "Just One Word Of Consolation" w. Frank B. Williams m. Tom Lemonier
- "Keep on the Sunny Side" w. Jack Drislane m. Theodore F. Morse
- "Kiss, Kiss, Kiss (If You Want To Learn To Kiss)" w. Harry B. Smith m. Gertrude Hoffmann
- "Lassie, Dinna Sigh For Me" w.m. Hector Grant
- "A Lemon In The Garden Of Love" w. M. E. Rourke m. Richard Carle
- "Let Bygones Be Bygones And Let Us Be Sweethearts Again" w. Alex Rogers m. Bert Williams
- "Let It Alone" w. Alex Rogers m. Bert Williams
- "Let Me See You Smile" Fischer
- "The Little Chauffeur" Bowers
- "The Load That Father Carried" w. Frank Fogerty m. J. B. Mullen
- "Love Me And The World Is Mine" w. Dave Reed Jr m. Ernest R. Ball
- "Mississippi Sunflower" (characteristic march & two-step) m. Otto and John Heinzman
- "Moonbeams" w. Henry Blossom m. Victor Herbert
- "Moonlight Dance" m. Herman Finck
- "Mr Monkey" Edwards
- "My Mariuccia Take A Steamboat" w. George Ronklyn m. Al Piantadosi
- "National Emblem" m. E. E. Bagley
- "The Next Horse I Ride On" w.m. Fred Murray & George Everard
- "Not Because Your Hair Is Curly" w.m. Bob Adams
- "Nothing Like That In Our Family" Heelan, Furth
- "Pickles and peppers" Adaline Shepherd
- "Poor John" w. Fred W. Leigh m. Henry E. Pether
- "The Poor Old Man" w.m. Vincent Bryan
- "School Days" w. Will D. Cobb m. Gus Edwards
- "Since Father Went To Work" w.m. William Cahill
- "Some One Looks Good To Some One" Weaver
- "The Streets Of New York" w. Henry Blossom m. Victor Herbert from the musical The Red Mill
- "Sunbonnet Sue" w. Will D. Cobb m. Gus Edwards
- "Sweet Anastasia Brady" Schwartz
- "That's The Reason Noo I Wear A Kilt" w.m. A. B. Kendal & Harry Lauder
- "Waltz Me Around Again Willie" w. Will D. Cobb m. Ren Shields (From the musical "His Honor the Mayor")
- "We Parted On The Shore" w.m. Harry Lauder
- "We've Been Chums For Fifty Years" w.m. Thurland Chattaway
- "What a Mouth" w.m. R. P. Weston
- "What's The Use Of Loving If You Can't Love All The Time" w. Joseph Mittenthal m. Harry Armstrong
- "When Love Is Young In Springtime" w.m. Rida Johnson Young & Melville Ellis
- "When The Whip-poor-will Sings, Marguerite" w. C. M. Denison m. J. Fred Helf
- "When Tommy Atkins Marries Dolly Gray" w. Will D. Cobb m. Gus Edwards
- "When You Know You're Not Forgotten By The Girl You Can't Forget" w. Ed Gardinier m. J. Fred Helf
- "While The Old Mill Wheel Is Turning" w. Will D. Cobb m. Kerry Mills
- "You Can Have Broadway" w.m. George M. Cohan from the musical George Washington, Junior
- "You Can't Give Your Heart To Somebody Else And Still Hold Hands With Me" Edwards

== Recorded popular music ==
- "Stop Your Tickling Jock" – Harry Lauder

== Classical music ==
- Amy Beach – Variations on Balkan Themes, Op.60
- Frank Bridge –
  - Three Idylls for String Quartet
  - String Quartet No. 1 in E minor "Bologna"
- Grigoraş Dinicu – Hora staccato
- Ernő Dohnányi – String Quartet No. 2, Op. 15
- Edward Elgar – The Kingdom (oratorio)
- George Enescu –
  - Au soir, for four trumpets
  - Concertstück, for viola and piano
  - Decet for winds in D major, Op. 14
  - Légende, for trumpet and piano
- Charles Ives – Central Park in the Dark
- Paul Ladmirault – Variations sur des airs de biniou trégorois
- Theodore Leschetizky – 2 Morceaux, Op.47
- Gustav Mahler – Symphony No. 6 (3rd version)
- Carl Nielsen – String Quartet No. 4 in F major, Op. 44
- Sergei Rachmaninoff – Symphony No. 2 in E Minor
- Max Reger – Serenade in G for orchestra Op. 95
- Arnold Schoenberg – Chamber Symphony No. 1
- Josef Suk – Symphony No. 2 "Asrael"
- Sergei Taneyev – Piano Quartet in E major Op. 20
- Edgard Varèse – Un grand sommeil noir
- Anton Webern – Rondo for string quartet
- Leó Weiner
  - Serenade for Small Orchestra, Op. 3
  - String Quartet No.1, Op. 4

== Opera ==
- Walter Braunfels – Falada
- Cesar Cui - Mateo Falcone
- Enrique Granados - Gaziel
- Jules Massenet – Ariane
- Carl Nielsen – Maskarade
- Sergei Rachmaninoff – Francesca Da Rimini
- Max von Schillings - Moloch
- Dame Ethel Smyth – The Wreckers
- John Philip Sousa - The Free Lance
- Vincenzo Tommasini - Medea
- Ermanno Wolf-Ferrari – I quattro rusteghi

== Ballet ==
- January 6 - Cinderella - another new production of the Empire Theater - premieres in London. It is a fairy ballet in five scenes, choreography by Fred Farren, music by Sidney Jones.
- January 14 - The Debutante is produced at London's Empire Theater. The music by Cuthbert Clarke, the lead dancer Fred Farren.
- January 28 - Radha - a modern dance work by Ruth Saint Denis - is performed for the first time at a private performance at the New York Theater. Music by Leo Delibes.
- March 26 - Choreographer Ruth Saint Denis has two premieres: The Cobras (music by Leo Delibes) and The Incense (music by Harvey Worthington Loomis). Performed at the Hudson Theater in New York.
- May 14 - The London public sees its first complete performance of Coppélia by Leo Delibes as Adeline Genee recreates her famous role at the Empire Theater.
- August 6 - Fete Galante premieres at the Empire Theater, London. This ballet is an extended version of the first scene of Cinderella, produced at the same theater on January 6 of this year.

== Musical theater ==
- About Town Broadway production
- Forty-Five Minutes From Broadway Broadway production
- The Free Lance Broadway production
- George Washington, Junior Broadway production opened at the Herald Square Theatre on February 12 and ran for 81 performances.
- His Honor the Mayor Broadway production
- A Parisian Model Broadway production
- The Little Cherub London production
- The Red Mill Broadway production
- Seeing New York Broadway production opened at the New York Roof Theatre on June 5 and ran for 75 performances
- The Spring Chicken Broadway production opened at Daly's Theatre on October 8 and transferred to the New Amsterdam Theatre on December 10 and ran for a total of 91 performances.
- The Vicar of Wakefield London production

== Births ==
- January 1 – Giovanni D'Anzi, Italian songwriter (died 1974)
- January 4 – Frankie Newton, American trumpeter (died 1954)
- January 15 – Alessandro Cicognini, film composer (died 1995)
- January 21 – Gunnar Johansen, Danish composer and pianist (died 1991)
- January 21 – Igor Moiseyev, Russian dancer, choreographer and ballet director (died 2007)
- January 27 – Radamés Gnattali, Brazilian composer (died 1988)
- January 31
  - Benjamin Frankel, composer (died 1973)
  - Roosevelt Sykes, blues musician (died 1983)
- February 1 – Hildegarde, actress and cabaret singer (died 2005)
- February 1 – Pierre Capdevielle, French pianist and composer (died 1969)
- February 5 – Zara Levina, pianist and composer (died 1976)
- February 8 – Artur Balsam, Polish pianist (died 1994)
- February 19 – Grace Williams, Welsh composer (died 1977)
- February 21 – Jeanne Aubert, singer and actress (died 1988)
- March 3 – Barney Bigard, jazz musician (died 1980)
- March 13
  - Dave Kaye, British pianist (died 1996)
  - Frank Teschemacher, jazz musician (died 1932)
- March 20 – Ozzie Nelson, actor, band leader (died 1975)
- March 25 – Jean Sablon, French singer (died 1994)
- March 27 – Pee Wee Russell, jazz musician (died 1969)
- March 29 – E. Power Biggs, English organist (died 1977)
- April 6 – Luis Alberti, Dominican Republic musician (died 1976)
- April 8 – Raoul Jobin, French-Canadian tenor (died 1974)
- April 9 – Antal Doráti, conductor (died 1988)
- April 18 – Little Brother Montgomery, jazz musician (died 1985)
- April 28 – Paul Sacher, Swiss conductor (died 1999)
- May 5 – Maria Caniglia, Italian soprano (died 1979)
- May 17 – Zinka Milanov, Croatian soprano (died 1989)
- May 23 – Lucha Reyes, singer (d. 1944)
- June 1 – Walter Legge, record producer (died 1979)
- June 3 – Josephine Baker, US singer, dancer and toast of Paris (died 1975)
- June 21 – Grete Sultan, German-born American pianist (died 2005)
- June 26 – Alberto Rabagliati, Italian singer and actor (died 1974)
- June 28 – Safford Cape, American conductor and musicologist (died 1973)
- July 7 – Anton Karas, Austrian zither player and composer (died 1985)
- July 9 – Elisabeth Lutyens, English composer (died 1983)
- July 19 – Klaus Egge, Norwegian composer (died 1979)
- July 24 – Pierre Fournier, French cellist (died 1986)
- July 25 – Arthur Kreutz, American composer (died 1991)
- July 30 – Ľudovít Rajter, Slovak composer (died 2000)
- August 6 – Cátulo Castillo, Argentine tango composer (died 1975)
- August 10 – Sal Pace, American jazz clarinetist and saxophonist (died 1982)
- September 1 - Aksel Schiøtz, Danish tenor and later baritone (died 1975)
- September 4 – Alexander Moyzes, Slovak composer and conductor (died 1984)
- September 25 - Alfred Frankenstein, American music critic (died 1981)
  - Jaroslav Ježek, Czech composer (died 1942)
  - Dmitri Shostakovich, composer (died 1975)
- September 30 – Mireille Hartuch, French singer (died 1996)
- October 9 – Janis Ivanovs, Latvian composer (died 1983)
- October 10 – Paul Creston, (born as Joseph Guttoveggio), American composer (died 1985)
- October 15 – Victoria Spivey, US singer, pianist and composer (died 1976)
- October 22 – Charles Lynch, Irish concert pianist (died 1984)
- October 31 – Louise Talma, composer (died 1996)
- November 3 – Alma Rosé, violinist (died 1944)
- November 9 – Pete Brown, jazz musician (died 1963)
- December 5
  - Ahn Eak-tai, Korean-born conductor and composer (died 1965)
  - Elisabeth Höngen, German soprano (died 1997)
- December 10 – Harold Adamson, US lyricist (died 1980)
- December 23 - Ross Lee Finney - American composer (died 1997)
- December 25 - Peter Carl Goldmark - Hungarian electronic and recording engineer (died 1997)
- December 26 – Morgan Lewis, songwriter (died 1968)
- December 27 – Oscar Levant, pianist and actor (died 1972)
- Billie Maxwell, country guitarist/vocalist (died 1954)

== Deaths ==
- January 23 – Charles Hunter, ragtime composer (born 1876)
- January 30 – Paul Dresser, US composer (born 1857)
- February 25 – Anton Arensky, composer (born 1861)
- March 22 – Martin Wegelius, composer (born 1846)
- April 9 – Ángel Rubio y Laínez, composer (born 1846)
- April 25 – John Knowles Paine, organist and composer (born 1839)
- May 9 – Helen Lemmens-Sherrington, operatic soprano (born 1834)
- May 11 – Gottardo Aldighieri, operatic baritone (born 1824)
- May 24 – Heinrich Reimann, organist and composer (born 1850)
- May 30 – Enrique el Mellizo, flamenco singer (born 1848)
- June 7 – Signor Brocolini, opera singer (born 1841)
- July 1 – Manuel Patricio Rodríguez García, singer and music teacher (born 1805)
- July 8 – Ivan Melnikov, operatic baritone (born 1832)
- July 9 – Alfred Stelzner, designer of musical instruments (born 1852)
- July 29 – Alexandre Luigini, composer (born 1850)
- August 26 – Eugen Gura, opera singer (born 1842)
- September 1 – Giuseppe Giacosa, librettist for Giacomo Puccini
- October 18 – Léon Gastinel, composer (born 1823)
- October 23 – Vladimir Stasov, Russian critic (born 1824)
- December 14 – Federico Consolo, violinist and composer (born 1841)
- December 30 – Eugène Goossens, père, conductor (born 1845)
- date unknown
  - Léontine de Maësen, operatic soprano (born 1835)
  - Nissan Spivak, cantor and composer (born 1824)
