= List of ragtime composers =

A list of ragtime composers, including one or more famous or characteristic compositions.

== Pre-1940 ==
- Felix Arndt (1889–1918),"Desecration Rag" (1914), "Nola" (1916), "Operatic Nightmare" (1916)
- May Aufderheide (1888–1972), "Dusty Rag" (1908)
- Roy Bargy (1894–1974), "Pianoflage" (1922)
- Harry Belding (1882–1931), "Good Gravy Rag" (1913)
- Theron C. Bennett (1879–1937), "The St. Louis Tickle" (1904)
- Irving Berlin (1888–1989), "Alexander's Ragtime Band" (1911)
- Jean Schwartz (1878-1956), “April Fool Rag” (1911)
- Mike Bernard (1875-1938), "The Ragtime King" (1899), "The Battle of San Juan Hill" (1912), "Tantalizing Tingles" (1913)
- Charlotte Blake (1885–1979), “The Gravel Rag” (1908), "That Poker Rag" (1909)
- Eubie Blake (1887–1983), "Charleston Rag" (1903), "Chevy Chase" (1914), "Fizz Water" (1914)
- Rube Bloom (1902–1976), "That Futuristic Rag" (1923), "Soliloquy" (1926)
- Blind Boone (1864–1927), "Southern Rag Medley No. 2" (1909)
- George Botsford (1874–1949), "Black and White Rag"(1908), "Grizzly Bear Rag" (1910)
- Euday L. Bowman (1887–1949), "Twelfth Street Rag" (1914)
- Fleta Jan Brown, (1882–1938), "Tanglefoot Rag" (1907)
- Brun Campbell (1884–1952), "Barber Shop Rag"
- Hughie Cannon (1877–1912), "(Won't You Come Home) Bill Bailey" (1902)
- Louis Chauvin (1881–1908), "Heliotrope Bouquet" (1907)
- Axel Christensen (1881–1955), "The Ragtime Wedding March (Apologies to Mendelssohn)" (1902), "Cauldron Rag" (1909)
- Edward B. Claypoole (1883-1952), "Alabama Jigger" (1913), "Ragging the Scale" (1915), "Spooky Spooks" (1916)
- George L. Cobb (1886–1942), "Rubber Plant Rag" (1909) "Russian Rag" (1918)
- Nellie Weldon Cocroft (1885–1986), "The Pinywoods Rag" (1909)
- Zez Confrey (1895–1971), "Kitten on the Keys" (1921)
- Les C. Copeland (1887–1942), "French Pastry Rag" (1914)
- Irene Cozad (1888–1970), "Affinity Rag" (1910)
- Cecil Duane Crabb (1890–1953), "Fluffy Ruffles" (1907)
- Ford Dabney (1883–1958), "Oh! You Devil!" (1910)
- Reverend Gary Davis (1896–1972), "Italian Rag"
- Claude Debussy (1862–1918), "Golliwogg's Cakewalk" and "Général Lavine"
- Harry Engelman (1912-2002)
- James Reese Europe (1880–1919), "Castle House Rag"
- Libbie Erickson (1875–1938), "Topsy: Two Step" (1904)
- Ernst Fischer (1900–1975), "Pretty Baby"
- Henry W. Gaul (1895-1947) “Motor Boat Rag” (1911)
- George Gershwin (1898–1937), "Rialto Ripples" (1917)
- Irene Giblin (1888–1974), "Columbia Rag" (1910)
- Lucian Porter Gibson (1890–1959), "Jinx Rag" (1911)
- George Hamilton Green (1893–1970), "Ragtime Robin"
- Gene Greene (1877–1930), "King of the Bungaloos" (1911)
- Clifford Adams (1887-1961) “Ink Splotch Rag” (1909)
- Charles Roy Cox (1880-1939) “Centennial Rag” (1912)
- Albert Gumble (1883–1946), "Bolo Rag" (1908)
- Harry P. Guy (1870–1950), "Echoes from the Snowball Club" (1898)
- Robert Hampton (1890–1945), "Cataract Rag" (1914), "Agitation Rag" (1915)
- W.C. Handy (1873-1958), "Yellow Dog Rag" (1914), "Ole Miss Rag" (1916)
- Ben Harney (1871–1938), "You've Been a Good Old Wagon but You Done Broke Down" (1896)
- Scott Hayden (1882–1915), "Something Doing" (1903)
- Wallie Herzer (1885–1961), "Everybody Two-Step" (1911)
- Ernest Hogan (1865–1909), "La Pas Ma La" and "All Coons Look Alike to Me"
- Abe Holzmann (1874–1939), "Smoky Mokes" (1899)
- Charles Hunter (1876–1906), "Tickled to Death" (1899)
- Harry Jentes (1887–1958), "Bantam Step" (1916)
- Charles L. Johnson (1876–1950), "Dill Pickles" (1906)
- James P. Johnson (1891–1955), "Carolina Shout" (1925)
- Scott Joplin (1868–1917), "Maple Leaf Rag" (1899), "The Entertainer" (1902), "Pineapple Rag" (1908), "Magnetic Rag" (1914)
- Joe Jordan (1882–1971), "That Teasin' Rag" (1909)
- Verdi Karns (1882–1925), "Kentucky Rag" (1898), "Bluffton Carnival Rag" (1899)
- F. Henri Klickmann (1885-1966), "Knockout Drops" (1910), "The Squirrel Rag" (1913), "Hysterics Rag" (1914)
- Sadie Koninsky (1879–1952), "Eli Green's Cake Walk" (1898)
- Max Kortlander (1890–1961), "Deuces Wild" (1923)
- William Krell (1868–1933), "Mississippi Rag" (1897)
- Joseph Lamb (1887–1960), "American Beauty Rag" (1913), "Ragtime Nightingale" (1915), "Top Liner Rag" (1916), "Bohemia Rag" (1919)
- Dominic LaRocca (1889-1961), "Tiger Rag" (1917), "The Original Dixieland One Step" (1917)
- Grace LeBoy (1890–1983), "Everybody Rag With Me" (1914)
- Grace Walls Linn (1874–1940), "Automobile Spin" (1899)
- Henry Lodge (1884–1933), "Temptation Rag" (1909)
- George Lyons (1889–1958), "Spaghetti Rag" (1910)
- Arthur Marshall (1881–1968), "Ham And!" (1908), 'The Pippin'' (1908)
- Artie Matthews (1888–1958), "Pastime Rag No. 3" (1916)
- Billy Mayerl (1902–1959), "The Jazz Master" (1925)
- Blind Willie McTell (1898–1959) "Southern Can Is Mine" (1931)
- Kerry Mills (1869–1948), "At a Georgia Campmeeting" (1897)
- Luella Lockwood Moore (aka "Marion Arlington") (1864–1927), "Flamingo: Two-Step" (1910)
- Jelly Roll Morton (1890–1941), "Frog-I-More Rag" (1918)
- Julia Lee Niebergall (1886–1968), "Hoosier Rag" (1907)
- Theodore Havermeyer Northrup (1866–1919), "Louisiana Rag" (1897)
- Phil Ohman (1896–1954), "Dixie Kisses" (1919)
- Muriel Pollock (1895–1970), "Rooster Rag" (1917)
- Paul Pratt (1890–1948), "Colonial Glide" (1910), "Hot House Rag" (1914)
- Arthur Pryor (1870–1942), "Razzazza Mazzazza" (1905)
- Luckey Roberts (1887–1968), "Junk Man Rag" (1913)
- Bess E. Rudisill (1884–1957), "The Eight O'Clock Rush" (1911)
- J. Russel Robinson (1892–1963), "Sapho Rag" (1909)
- Alma Sanders (1882–1956), "Hong Kong" (1917)
- Paul Sarebresole (1875–1911), "Roustabout Rag" (1897)
- Arthur Schutt (1902–1965), "Bluin' the Black Keys" (1926)
- James Scott (1885–1938), "Frog Legs Rag" (1906), "Grace and Beauty" (1909), "Hilarity Rag" (1910), "Ragtime Oriole" (1911)
- Adaline Shepherd (1883–1950), "Pickles and Peppers" (1906)
- Willie "The Lion" Smith (1897–1973), "Rippling Waters"
- Ted Snyder (1881–1965), "Wild Cherries Rag" (1909), "Ramshackle Rag" (1911)
- John Philip Sousa (1854–1932), "With Pleasure" (1912) and "Willow Blossoms" (1916)
- Etilmon J. Stark (1867–1962), "Billiken Rag" (1913)
- Nellie Stokes (1880–1914), "Razzle Dazzle: Rag" (1909)
- Pauline B. Story (1870–1952), "Keep A Shufflin’ Ragtime Dance" (1905)
- Charley Straight (1891–1940), "Red Raven Rag" (1915), "Black Jack Rag" (1917), Rufenreddy" (1917/1922)
- Igor Stravinsky (1882–1971), "Piano-Rag-Music" (1919)
- Robert Morrison Stults (1861–1933), "Walkin' on de Rainbow Road" (1899)
- Wilbur Sweatman (1882–1961), "Down Home Rag" (1911)
- Charles Hubbard Thompson (1891–1964), "The Lily Rag" (1914)
- Harry Tierney (1890–1965), "Uncle Tom's Cabin" (1911)
- Tom Turpin (1873–1922), "Harlem Rag" (1897), "St. Louis Rag" (1903), "Buffalo Rag" (1904)
- Fats Waller (1904–1943), "Valentine Stomp" (1929)
- Percy Wenrich (1880–1952), "Peaches and Cream" (1905), "Skeleton Rag" (1911)
- Clarence C. Wiley (1883–1908), "Car-Barlick Acid" (1901)
- Carlotta Williamson (1869–1957), "The Pickaninny Cakewalk: Two Step" (1901), "Wild flower Rag" (1910)
- Clarence Woods (1888–1956), "Slippery Elm Rag" (1912), "Sleepy Hollow Rag" (1918)
- Calvin Woolsey (1884–1946), "Medic Rag" (1910)
- Bob Yosco (1889–1958), "Spaghetti Rag" (1910)
- Bob Zurke (1912-1944), "Hobson Street Blues" (1938)

== Modern ragtime composers (since 1940) ==
- William Albright (1944–1998), "Brass Knuckles"
- Peter Andersson (born 1968), "Commonplace Rag"
- Donald Ashwander (1929–1994), "Business in Town", "Old Streets", etc.
- Winifred Atwell (1914–1989), "Britannia Rag", "Let's Have a Party", her version of "Black and White Rag", etc.
- Rami Bar-Niv "Blue-Rag" "Drag-Rag" "Breezy Rider Rag"
- William Bolcom (born 1938), "The Graceful Ghost"
- Dave Brubeck (1920–2012), "It's a Raggy Waltz" (1961)
- Lou Busch (1910–1979), "Carr's Hop" (1952)
- Stephen Flaherty (born 1960), Ragtime
- Frank French (born 1952), "Belle of Louisville"
- Dick Hyman (born 1927), "Ragtime Razz Matazz" (1958)
- Glenn Jenks, "The Harbour Rag"
- Billy Joel (born 1949), "Root Beer Rag" (1974)
- Elena Kats-Chernin (born 1957), "Russian Rag"
- Sue Keller (born 1952), "Cranberry Stomp"
- Koji Kondo (born 1961), "Athlete's Rag" (1990)
- Bill Krenz (1899–1980), "Mud Cat Rag" (1953), "Poodle Rag" (1954)
- Tom Lehrer (1928–2025), "The Vatican Rag"
- Johnny Maddox, "Friday Night Stomp"
- Max Morath (1926–2023), "One for Amelia", "The Golden Hours", etc.
- Carter Pann (born 1972), "The Bills"
- David Thomas Roberts (born 1955), "Roberto Clemente"
- Aaron Robinson (born 1970), "Bluet Rag"
- Reginald Robinson (born 1972), "The Strong Man"
- Cameron Lee Simpson (born 2001), "Cherry Blossom Rag" (2019), "Hey-O" (2023), "Skeleton Blues" (2023) etc.
- Thomas Shea (1931–1982), "Little Wabash Special"
- Adam Swanson (born 1992), "Strater Shuffle," "A Novice Novelty," etc.
- Trebor Jay Tichenor (1940–2014), "Bucksnort Stomp"
- Hiromi Uehara (born 1979), "The Tom and Jerry Show" (2003)
- Nobuo Uematsu (born 1959), "Spinach Rag" (1994), "Dark City Treno" (2000)
- Kjell Waltman (born 1960), "Orange Blossoms"
- Chris Ware (born 1967), "Farewell"
- Ian Whitcomb (1941–2020), "Lawns of Louisiana", "Marzipan", and others
- Dick Zimmerman (born 1937), "Lost And Found Rag"
- Tom Brier (born 1971), "Blue Lampshade", "Skunk Hollow Rag", and
- Paul Molans (born 1953), "Ragtime in Blue", Springtime Rag" , and more.
- others
