= List of compositions by James Scott =

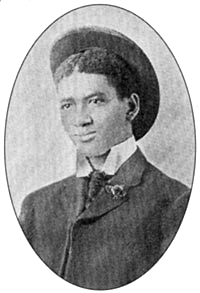
James Scott

This is a complete list of compositions by James Scott (February 12, 1885 – August 30, 1938). James Scott was one of the three leading composers of ragtime.

Title	Year	Notes	Cover page
A Summer Breeze	1903	March and Two-Step; Wikidata Q19109151 James Scott - A Summer Breeze (1903)	
The Fascinator	1903	Wikidata Q123139399 James Scott - The Fascinator (1903)	
On the Pike	1904	Rag-Time Two-Step; Wikidata Q19087003 James Scott - On The Pike (1904)	
Frog Legs Rag	1906	Wikidata Q5505200 James Scott - Frog Legs Rag (1906)	
Kansas City Rag	1907	Wikidata Q19082189 James Scott - Kansas City Rag (1920)	
Grace and Beauty	1909	Wikidata Q5591420 James Scott - Grace and Beauty (1909)	
Great Scott Rag	1909	Wikidata Q19062431 James Scott - Great Scott Rag (1909)	
Ragtime Betty	1909	Wikidata Q19090998 James Scott - Ragtime Betty (1909)	
Sunburst Rag	1909	Wikidata Q19070521 James Scott - Sunburst Rag (1909)	
Valse Venice	1909	Wikidata Q19044939	
Hearts Longing	1909	Wikidata Q19031229	
She's My Girl from Anaconda	1909	Lyrics by C. R. Dumars; Wikidata Q19034315	
Sweetheart Time	1909	Lyrics by C. R. Dumars; Wikidata Q19071881	
Hilarity Rag	1910	Wikidata Q19038034 James Scott - Hilarity Rag (1910)	
Ophelia Rag	1910	Wikidata Q19088028 James Scott - Ophelia Rag (1910)	
Princess Rag	1911	Wikidata Q19064609 James Scott - Princess Rag (1911)	
Quality	1911	Wikidata Q123240806 James Scott - Quality (1911)	
Ragtime Oriole	1911	Wikidata Q19091002 James Scott - Ragtime Oriole (1911)	
Climax Rag	1914	Wikidata Q19042982 James Scott - Climax Rag (1914)	
The Suffragette Waltz	1914	Wikidata Q123149511 James Scott - Suffragette Waltz (1914)	
Take Me Out To Lakeside	1914	Lyrics by Ida Miller; Wikidata Q19073023	
Evergreen Rag	1915	Wikidata Q19097539 James Scott - Evergreen Rag (1915)	
Honey Moon Rag	1916	Wikidata Q19045442 James Scott - Honey Moon Rag (1916)	
Prosperity Rag	1916	Wikidata Q19086297 James Scott - Prosperity Rag (1916)	
Efficiency Rag	1917	Wikidata Q19092853 James Scott - Efficiency Rag (1917)	
Paramount Rag	1917	Wikidata Q19022912 James Scott - Paramount Rag (1917)	
Dixie Dimples	1918	Wikidata Q19083706 James Scott - Dixie Dimples (1918)	
Rag Sentimental	1918	Wikidata Q19090962 James Scott - Rag Sentimental (1918)	
Springtime of Love	1918	Wikidata Q19053138	
New Era Rag	1919	Wikidata Q19071797 James Scott - New Era Rag (1919)	
Peace and Plenty Rag	1919	Wikidata Q19028267 James Scott - Peace and Plenty Rag (1919)	
Troubadour Rag	1919	Wikidata Q19113265 James Scott - Troubadour Rag (1919)	
Modesty Rag	1920	Wikidata Q19049471 James Scott - Modesty Rag (1920)	
Pegasus (rag)	1920	Wikidata Q19029397 James Scott - Pegasus (1920)	
Shimmie Shake	1920	Lyrics by Cleota Wilson; Wikidata Q19110070	
Don't Jazz Me Rag	1921	Wikidata Q19085388 James Scott - Don't Jazz Me Rag (1921)	
Victory Rag	1921	Wikidata Q19114877 James Scott - Victory Rag (1921)	
Broadway Rag	1922	Wikidata Q4972501 James Scott - Broadway Rag (1922)	
Calliope Rag	1966	published posthumously	
