= Terra Verde =

Terra Verde is a relatively new style of syncopated piano music, which originated in the United States. The term "Terra Verde" (meaning "green earth") was coined in 1995 by modern ragtime composer David Thomas Roberts (in conjunction with Scott Kirby).

== History ==
Most of the Terra Verde works were written between the early 1980s and the present. Some of the most significant compositions in this genre are "Maria Antonieta Pons" (David Thomas Roberts, 1986/87), "Ravenna" (Scott Kirby, 1993), "At Midnight" (Hal Isbitz, 1991), "The Big Man" (Tom McDermott, 1990), "La Cumbia" (Frank French, 1992) and "North Star" (Brian Keenan, 1994/95).

Terra Verde is strongly rooted in ragtime (examples: Scott Joplin, James Scott, Joseph Lamb), new (or contemporary) ragtime (David Thomas Roberts, Frank French, Scott Kirby), Latin American music (Ernesto Nazareth, Ernesto Lecuona) and Romantic music of the 19th century (Frédéric Chopin, Louis Moreau Gottschalk).

The prime venue for Terra Verde music (from 2002 to 2005) was the Rocky Mountain Ragtime Festival, which was held each July in Boulder, Colorado.

In July 2002, a Terra Verde Society was formed by Gina Tiernan together with David Thomas Roberts, Frank French and Scott Kirby, and was active until 2004. The Terra Verde Corner (created in 1997 by Oleg Mezjuev and Mary Haley) was the official website of the society.

Also, in Early Renaissance history - thirteenth, fourteenth and early fifteenth century - it was a type of paint, where terra verde meant green earth and was used for underpainting on panel paintings with tempera. It was used for mainly the flesh, though this colour was used to outline drapery as well. Cennino stated that the terra verde should not be seen under the accompanying layers of tempera.
