= Charles Hubbard Thompson =

American ragtime composer (1891–1964)

Charles Hubbard Thompson (June 19, 1891 – June 13, 1964) was a ragtime pianist and composer.

Born in St. Louis, Missouri, he took some piano lessons during his youth, though he later described himself as self-taught. He left St. Louis in 1911 to tour in Ohio and Indiana. In 1912, he met James P. Johnson in either Washington D.C or Coney Island. Thompson also played in Buffalo, New York, Detroit, Cleveland, Toledo, Erie/Pennsylvania, and Atlantic City/New Jersey.

He won the great ragtime contest of 1916 in the Booker T. Washington Theatre of in St. Louis, with his composition "The Lily Rag". He defeated Tom Turpin, the owner of the theatre and the owner of the "Rosebud Club", where nearly all the great ragtimers of America met since 1900.

== See also ==
- List of ragtime composers
