= Stults =

The Stults surname is the Dutch or Americanized spelling of the German surname Stultz.

Origin: Germany

== Notable people with the surname 'Stults' ==
- Eric Stults (born 1979), American baseball player
- Geoff Stults (born 1977), American actor
- George Stults (born 1975), American actor and fashion model
- Robert Morrison Stults (1861–1933), American composer and publisher
