= Clarence Woods =

American ragtime composer

- Born: Clarence Homer Woods; June 19, 1888; Adams County, Ohio, United States
- Died: September 30, 1956 (aged 68)
- Other name: H. Clarence Woods
- Occupation: ragtime composer
- Parents: Samuel C. Woods (father); Margeret (Maggie) Woods (mother)

Clarence Homer Woods (June 19, 1888 – September 30, 1956) was an early American ragtime composer.

== Formative years ==
Born in Adams County, Ohio to Samuel C. and Margeret (Maggie) Woods, Clarence was raised in both eastern Kansas and Carthage in southwest Missouri. Note that some sources list him as H. Clarence Woods, but multiple US Census and local Census records clearly list him as Clarence H. Woods, and his World War I Draft card shows him simply as Clarence Woods. The 1895 Kansas Census shows the family in Girard, Kansas. His father was a blacksmith, and he had two younger brothers and two younger sisters. Clarence was in the midst of a hotbed of ragtime as he grew up. He took piano lessons from the same teacher as James Scott, but whether they knew each other well is not known for certain. Both had their first compositions published by Dumars Music in Carthage as well, with Woods contributing Meteor March slightly in advance of Scott's On the Pike.

== Early career ==
In his late teens, Woods started traveling outside of Missouri into Oklahoma and Texas, playing for stage plays, Vaudeville olios, silent films, and other accompanist positions. His performance skills eventually saw him lauded in print as the "Ragtime Wonder of the South." He was married by 1913 or so to Marie E. Woods, and Clarence Jr. was born around 1914. In early 1917 he was listed at a Carthage residence of 301 N. Main, and playing for movies at the Sho-To-Al Theater. By 1920 Woods and the family had moved north to Nevada, Missouri, now playing for movies at the Star Theater plus other area engagements.

Wood's ragtime output was small, but significant. Even though he had been on the road for some time he was still based in Carthage, his rags and blues heavily reflected the influence of the Jasper County area, with his Sleepy Hollow Rag named for a community on the Spring River near Carthage. Woods was more known as a performer than composer, although he co-wrote a few lesser songs and some early blues. Two of his novelty pieces appeared only on piano rolls, but both Black Satin and the recently discovered Fever Heat show signs of a clear understanding of that genre, in which he did not follow up. The 1930 Census shows Marie and Clarence Jr. back in Carthage, but she is now divorced from the traveling pianist. He was remarried now to Gladys Woods, based in Tulsa, Oklahoma, still listed as a theater pianist.

== Later career ==
In Clarence's later years, he led an orchestra, became a radio entertainer, and started composing more. His last pieces, largely unknown and unpublished, were written in his capacity of composer/arranger, mostly for the presentational needs of Ringling Brothers Barnum and Bailey Circus from the early 1940s to the 1950s, where he also performed on the organ and calliope.

Known Compositions:

- Meteor March (1903)
- Slippery Elm Rag (1912)
- The Graveyard Blues [w/John S. Caldwell] (1916)
- The Worried Blues [w/Le Roy Williams] (1916)
- Sleepy Hollow Rag (1918)
- Who's Been Playin' Papa 'Round Here While I've Been Gone? (1919)
- Fever Heat [Rag Novelty - Piano Roll] (1919?)
- Black Satin [Fox Trot - Piano Roll] (1920)
- Oklahoma, I Love You [w/Opal Harrison Williford] (1938)

== See also ==
- List of ragtime composers
