= David Thomas Roberts =

American classical composer (born 1955)

David Thomas Roberts (born January 16, 1955) is an American composer and musician, known primarily as a modern ragtime composer. Roberts is also a painter in a primitivist style.

Born in Moss Point, Mississippi, United States, his first recording, "Music For a Pretty Baby", appeared in 1978. Pieces such as "The Early Life of Larry Hoffer", "Roberto Clemente", "Pinelands Memoir", "Through the Bottomlands", and the suite, "New Orleans Streets" have caused Roberts to be considered one of the leading contemporary ragtime-based composers. The New Orleans historian Al Rose called him "the most important composer of this half of the century in America."

Roberts coined the term "Terra Verde" (meaning "green earth") as a label for compositions which can not be considered as conventional ragtime, mostly by contemporary ragtime writers such as himself, Frank French, Scott Kirby, Hal Isbitz and others.

Roberts also works as a writer and visual artist. His mixed-media art appears in the magazine of visionary art, Raw Vision, and his poetry has been anthologized in Another South, a collection of experimental writing published in 2003 by the University of Alabama Press.

== Selected discography ==
=== From Discovery (2005) ===
(All original compositions, except where noted.)

1. Discovery (2004)
2. Charbonneau (2000) (Kirby)
3. Mariana's Waltz (2003)
4. Ice Floes in Eden (1986) (Budd)
5. Memories of a Missouri Confederate (1989)
6. Fantasy in D (2000–01)
7. Chorale-Prelude (1989)
8. Chorale No. 2 (1990)
9. Frederic and the Coast (1979)
10. Cynthia (2003–04)
11. Babe of the Mountains (1997–98)
12. Nancy's Library (2004–05)

=== From American Landscapes (1998) ===
(All original compositions, except the track "Dixon.")

1. Pinelands Memoir (1978)
2. The Girl Who Moved Away (1981–82)
3. Back to Marion County (1981)
4. Through the Bottomlands (1980)
5. Muscatine (1979)
6. Kreole (1978)
7. Dixon (1983)
8. The Girl On the Other Side (1979)
9. Franklin Avenue (1981–85)
10. Fontainebleau Drive (1981–85)
11. Napoleon Avenue (1981–85)
12. Madison Heights Girl (1979)
13. Anna (1978)
14. Roberto Clemente (1979)
15. For Kansas City (1980)

=== From Early Tangoes to New Ragtime (1994) ===
(Mostly compositions by others. Roberts' compositions include For Molly Kaufman, Memories of a Missouri Confederate, and The Queen of North Missouri.)

1. Odeon
2. Matuto
3. Rapid Transit
4. Bee Hive Rag
5. The Naked Dance
6. For Molly Kaufmann
7. The Show-me Rag
8. The Nonpareil
9. Mississippi River Boulevard
10. Show Fly
11. Memories of a Missouri Confederate
12. Belle of Louisville
13. Morelia
14. Esta' Chumbado
15. Escovado
16. The Big Man
17. Mississippi Soul
18. The Queen of North Missouri
19. Ravenna

=== From Scott Joplin the Complete Piano Music, Vol. 1 ===
(All compositions by Scott Joplin.)

1. Original Rags
2. Leola
3. Pleasant Moments
4. Peacherine Rag
5. Sunflower Slow Drag
6. Maple Leaf Rag
7. Weeping Willow
8. Bink's Waltz
9. Elite Syncopations
10. The Favorite
11. Swipesy
12. Antoinette
13. The Nonpareil
14. Gladiolus Rag
15. The Easy Winners

=== From 15 Ragtime Compositions ===
(All original compositions by Roberts.)

1. Waterloo Girls
2. Camille
3. Kreole
4. Frederic and the Coast
5. Madison Heights Girl
6. Poplarville
7. Through the Bottomlands
8. Pinelands Memoir
9. For Kansas City
10. The Girl Who Moved Away
11. Mississippi Brown Eyes
12. The Early Life of Larry Hoffer
13. The South Mississippi Glide
14. Roberto Clemente
15. Maria Antonieta Pons

=== From New Orleans Streets ===
(All original compositions by Roberts.)

1. Introduction
2. Decatur Street
3. Burgundy Street
4. Franklin Avenue
5. Jackson Avenue
6. Waltz
7. Napoleon Avenue
8. Magazine Street
9. Toulouse Street
10. Annunciation Street
11. Broad Avenue
12. Interlude
13. Fontainbleau Drive
14. Revenge
15. Farewell

=== From New Orleans Ragtime Piano ===
(Roberts plays compositions by others.)

1. Pretty Baby
2. Kansas City Stomps
3. Mamanita
4. Fat Frances
5. Honky Tonk Music
6. Stratford Hunch
7. The Pearls
8. Tom Cat Blues
9. Mr. Jelly Lord
10. New Orleans Joys
11. The Naked Dance
12. Sponge

=== From Folk Ragtime: 1899-1914 ===
(Roberts plays compositions by others.)

1. Blue Blazes
2. Tennessee Tantalizer (a Southern Tickler)
3. A Tennessee Jubilee
4. Tickled to Death
5. Poison Rag
6. Scizzor Bill
7. The Dockstader Rag
8. Camp Meeting Melodies
9. Blind Boone's Southern Rag Medley No.2 (strains From Flat Branch)
10. Felix Rag (a Phenomenal Double Ragtime Two Step)
11. The Pirate Rag
12. Medic Rag
13. Just Ask Me
14. Why We Smile
15. Cotton Bolls
16. Possum and 'Taters (A Ragtime Feast)
17. The Black Cat Rag
18. X.L. Rag
19. A Barn Dance Shuffle
20. Whittling Remus
21. Lover's Lane Glide

=== Other David Thomas Roberts compositions / recordings ===
- To Nita and Raul Casso in Laredo appear on the CD Terra Verde.
- For Robin Holtz Williams appears on the album Frontiers.

== See also ==
- List of ragtime composers
