= Havermeyer =

- List of Catch-22 characters
- Henry Osborne Havemeyer (1847–1907), American businessman
- Theodore Havermeyer Northrup (1866–1919), musician
