= Broadway Rag =

Musical composition

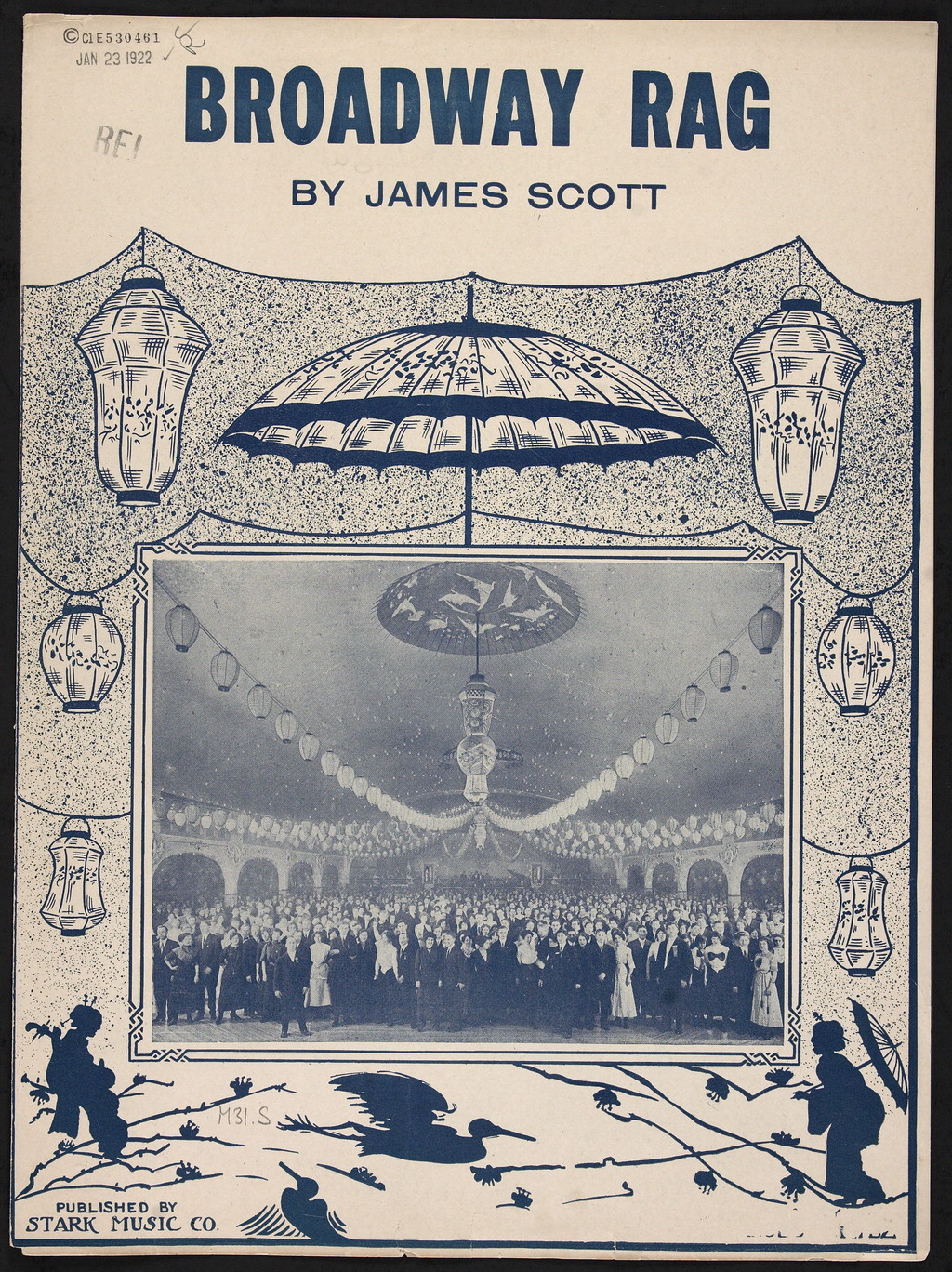

"Broadway Rag" is a rag composed by James Scott and published as sheet music by Stark Music in 1922.

The structure is:

Intro AA BB A Trio-Intro CC BB
