= Evergreen Rag =

- Rag by James Scott
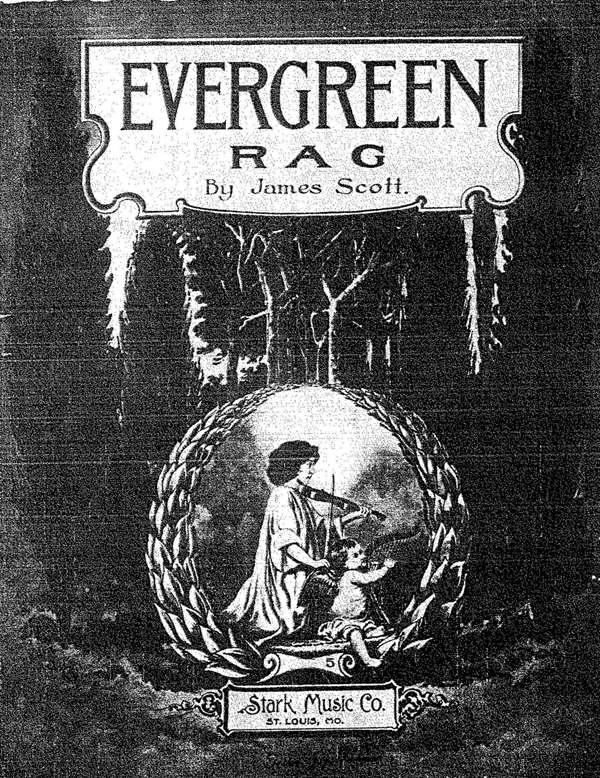
- Cover of the score
- Key: G major
- Year: 1915
- Published: 1915 - St. Louis
- Publisher: Stark Music Co.
- Duration: Three minutes approximately
- Scoring: Solo piano

Evergreen Rag is a rag for piano composed by American composer James Scott. Written in 1915, it is one of the composer's best-known works.

== Background ==
Largely a self-taught musician, James Scott started to publish his own works before his twentieth birthday. In 1906, he moved to St. Louis in order to meet one of the most prominent figures in the ragtime scene, Scott Joplin. He then toured the midwest until he finally settled in Kansas City, where he continued to perform and teach piano. Evergreen Rag was written shortly after he moved to Kansas City in 1915, just around the time he was married and decided to devote his life to composing and teaching rather than performing in public. It was not copyrighted but was published that same year by Stark Music Co., the publisher Joplin introduced Scott to, in St. Louis. A player piano roll was made possibly by Scott himself also in 1915. It was issued by the U.S. Music Company as US Music 7278B.

== Structure ==
This rag is approximately three minutes long and is scored for solo piano. It is marked “Not fast” at the beginning, with no further tempo indications or changes. The piece follows Scott’s typical ragtime structure, which can be summarized as follows:

- introduction A. A concise, 4-bar introduction in G major establishes the rhythmic and melodic character of the work. It is separated from the rest by a double bar.
- Section A, which presents the main theme. Also in the key of G major, it is repeated, with different ending noting the lead-up into the repeated (or following) section
- Section B, which introduces an additional contrasting melody, also in G major. It is also repeated.
- Trio (Section C). It appears in C major and is repeated.
- Introduction B, with thematic material from section B that is used to introduce the last segment of the piece.
- Section B returns in the key of G major, which closes the piece after it is repeated for the last time.

Scott uses some distinctive features of some of his light rags: he uses left-hand moving octaves to mark the beat. Compared to other Scott pieces, syncopation is scarce, especially on sections B and C.

== Recordings ==
The composer's original piano roll of Evergreen Rag, made in 1915, was first reissued in 1975 by Biograph in the compilation James Scott Vol. 1 – Classic Ragtime From Rare Piano Rolls. This piano roll constitutes Scott's only surviving recorded performance of the piece. Since then, other pianists have recorded the work as part of broader efforts to present and preserve early 20th century ragtime works. The following is a list of recordings of Evergreen Rag:

Recordings of Scott's Evergreen Rag
Piano	Date of recording	Place of recording	Label	Notes
Joshua Rifkin	August 1990	St. George's Church, Bristol, UK	Decca	
Guido Nielsen	February 2000	E-Sound Studios, Weesp, Netherlands	Basta	

== Reception ==
Evergreen Rag has often been praised by both performers and listeners as a piece of light music, describing it as "bright", "cheerful", and "non-pretentious".
