= Sadie Koninsky =

American composer (1879–1952)

Sadie G. Koninsky
- Born: August 1879; Troy, New York, United States
- Died: January 2, 1952 Troy, New York
- Genres: Waltz, March, Cakewalk, Foxtrot
- Occupations: Composer, arranger, music publisher, music teacher, violinist
- Years active: 1894–1947

Sadie G. Koninsky (August 1879 – January 2, 1952) was an American composer, music publisher, and music teacher who lived most of her life in Troy, New York. A prolific composer, she is thought to have authored over 300 pieces of music, including waltzes and marches. "Eli Green's Cakewalk", which became a popular hit when it appeared in 1898, was also the first cakewalk published by a woman. Some of her work was published under her male pseudonym, Jerome Hartman.

== Biography ==
Sadie was the youngest of the five children born to Harris and Mary Koninsky of Troy, New York. Both parents were of European extraction. As a child, she received classical training in violin.

Her first published compositions, "The Belles of Andalusia" (a waltz) and "The Minstrel King" (a march) appeared in 1894 and 1895, respectively. In 1896, she sold "Eli Green's Cake Walk" to Joseph W. Stern, a music publisher in New York City, who published it (under her legal name) with lyrics added by a staff writer. After studying piano with Harriet Brower, she took a job at Stern's company as an arranger.

Soon afterward, Sadie and her brother Maurice went into the music business. By 1899, the family business, then known as "Edw. M. Koninsky & Brothers", was publishing music, including Sadie's sequel titled "Phoebe Thompson's Cake Walk". She became the main arranger and composer at Koninsky Music. During this time, her marches appeared under the name of "Jerome Hartman".

During the 1920s, Sadie launched a publishing house of her own (Goodwyn Music Publishers) and also taught music and violin. She was still teaching in 1947. She died on January 2, 1952, and was buried at B'rith Sholom Cemetery in Troy.

== List of compositions ==
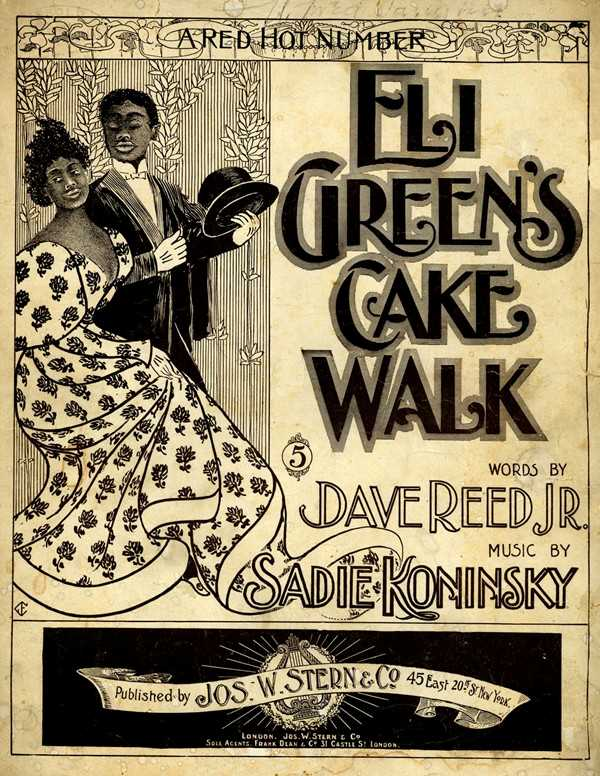

In chronological order:

- "Belles of Andalusia" — Valse Espagnole (M. Witmark & Sons, New York City, 1894, republished in 1899)
- "The Minstrel King" — March (Albany Music Publishing Company, Albany, New York, 1895)
- "Eli Green's Cake Walk" (song with lyrics by Dave Reed, Jr.) (Joseph W. Stern and Company, New York City, 1896 or 1898)
- "Where Love is King" — Waltzes (Howley, Haviland and Company, New York City, 1898)
- "I'll Be Your Friend Through All" (song) (M. Witmark and Sons, New York City, 1898)
- "Eli Green's Cake Walk" — March and Two Step (Joseph W. Stern and Company, New York City, 1898)
- "Boardin' House Johnson" — Cake Walk (Joseph W. Stern, New York City, 1899)
- "Phoebe Thompson's Cake Walk" (Edward M. Koninsky and Brothers, New York City, 1899)
- "When I Return We'll Be Wed" (with lyrics by Stewart M. Washburn) (Edward M. Koninsky and Brothers, Troy, New York, 1899)
- "Sing Me a Song of Other Days" (Edward M. Koninsky and Brothers, Brooklyn, New York, 1900)
- "You Alone" — Ballad (song, Edward M. Koninsky and Brothers, New York City, 1900)
- "Beneath the Starry Flag" (as "Jerome Hartman") (Edward M. Koninsky and Brothers, New York City, 1900)
- "I Didn't Think You Cared to Have Me Back" (with lyrics by Stewart M. Washburn) (Edward M. Koninsky and Brothers, New York City, 1900)
- "The Grasshopper's Hop" — A Bugtown Society Event (Edward M. Koninsky and Brothers, New York City, 1901)
- "In a Japanese Tea House" — Japanese Waltzes (with M. N. Koninsky) (Edward M. Koninsky and Brothers, Troy, New York, 1901)
- "When Mammy Puts Little Coons to Bed" (lullaby) (Edward M. Koninsky and Brothers, Troy, New York, 1901 or 1902)
- "I Wants a Man Who Ain't Afraid to Work" (with lyrics by Harry E. Stanley) (Edward M. Koninsky and Brothers, New York City, 1902)
- "Cleopatra" — An Egyptian Intermezzo (Shapiro, Bernstein and Company, New York City, 1902)
- "Forever" (song) (Edward M. Koninsky, Troy, New York, 1902)
- "The Return of the Troops" (as "Jerome Hartman") (Edward M. Koninsky and Brothers, Troy, New York, 1902)
- "A Wigwam Courtship" — Intermezzo (Edward M. Koninsky and Brothers, Troy, New York, 1903)
- "I Am Lonely Here Without You, Nellie Dear" (Edward M. Koninsky and Brothers, Troy, New York, 1903)
- "When You Are Near" (song) (Edward M. Koninsky and Brothers, Troy, New York, 1903)
- "If You Loved Me as I Love You" (song) (Koninsky Music Company, Troy, New York, 1903)
- "On To Victory" (as "Jerome Hartman") (Edward M. Koninsky and Brothers, Troy, New York, 1903)
- "Old Glory" — March and Two Step (as "Jerome Hartman") (Edward M. Koninsky and Brothers, Troy, New York, 1903)
- "Maid of the Mist" — Waltzes (Koninsky Music Company, Troy, New York, pre-1904 or 1908)
- "June Roses" — Waltzes (Koninsky Music Company, Troy, New York, 1905)
- "'Tis You" (Koninsky Music Company, Troy, New York, 1905)
- "'Cause the Sandman's Comin Around" (song) (Koninsky Music Company, Troy, New York, 1905)
- "In Lover's Lane" — Waltzes (Koninsky Music Company, Troy, New York, 1906)
- "Life in Camp" — March (as "Jerome Hartman") (Koninsky Music Company, Troy, New York, 1906 or 1907)
- "College Days" — Waltzes (Koninsky Music Company, New York City, 1907)
- "Love Tales" — Waltzes (1909)
- "Uncle Sam's Boys" — March (as "Jerome Hartman") (1909)
- Musical Moments (Opus 6) (1910)
  - Valsette
  - Melodie
  - Barcarolle
- "La Cascade" — Valse Caprice (1911)
- "Heart of the Rose" — Waltzes (Koninsky Music Company, New York City, 1911)
- "The River of Dreams" (song) (Koninsky Music Company, Troy, New York, 1912)
- "Joys of the Dance" — Waltz (1914)
- "If I Had All the World Besides I'd Still Want You!" (song, with J. Will Callahan) (Koninsky Music Company, Troy, New York, 1916)
- "Mae Marsh" — Waltzes (Koninsky Music Company, Troy, New York, 1917)
- "In Yucatan" — Novelty Fox Trot (Koninsky Music Company, Troy, New York, 1918)

== See also ==
- List of ragtime composers
