= Louis Chauvin =

American pianist and composer (1881-1908)

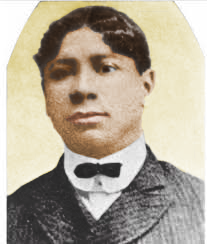
- Chauvin c. 1900s

Background information
- Born: March 13, 1881; St. Louis, Missouri, U.S.
- Died: March 26, 1908 (aged 27) Chicago, Illinois, U.S.
- Genre: Ragtime
- Occupation: Pianist
- Instrument: Piano

Louis Chauvin (March 13, 1881 – March 26, 1908) was an American ragtime pianist and composer.

== Early life ==
Born in St. Louis, Missouri, to a Mexican Spanish-Indian father and an African American mother, he was widely considered the finest pianist in the St. Louis area at the turn of the century. He was part of the ragtime community that met at Tom Turpin's Rosebud bar with Joe Jordan and others. Sam Patterson, a musician and life-long friend of Chauvin, later described him as,

About five feet five and never over 145 pounds. He looked delicate with his fine features and his long, tapering fingers, but he was wild and strong. He never gambled, but he stayed up, drank, and made lots of love. He loved women, but he treated them like dirt. He always had two or three. He loved whisky, too, but he only seemed to be living when he was at the piano. It's authentic, I guess, that he smoked opium at the last.

== Compositions ==
"Heliotrope Bouquet"
Chauvin's 1907 "Heliotrope Bouquet" being performed by a pianist circa 2007.

Chauvin left only three published compositions and died without having recorded. However, he was long remembered by his peers as an exceptionally gifted performer and composer. According to Sam Patterson, in 1950,

He would sit right down and compose a number with three or four strains. By tomorrow, it's gone and he's composing another. You can talk about harmony-no one could mistake those chords. Chauv was so far ahead with his modern stuff, he would be up to date now.

He is remembered today primarily for "Heliotrope Bouquet", the rag in which he shares compositional credit with Scott Joplin. The nature of the music seems to indicate that Chauvin provided the basis for the first two strains, and Joplin wrote the last two and edited the work into a cohesive piece due to the debilitating effects of Chauvin's illness.

His published works are:

- "The Moon Is Shining in the Skies" (with Sam Patterson, 1903)
- "Babe, It's Too Long Off" (words by Elmer Bowman, 1906)
- "Heliotrope Bouquet" (with Scott Joplin, 1907)

== Death ==
Chauvin died in Chicago at the age of 27; he has been cited as an early member of the "27 Club". His death certificate lists the causes of death as "multiple sclerosis, probably syphilitic" and starvation due to coma. However, a modern assessment would probably conclude he had neurosyphilitic sclerosis unrelated to multiple sclerosis. He is buried in Calvary Cemetery in St. Louis, Missouri.

He was portrayed by Clifton Davis in the 1977 film Scott Joplin.
