= Thomas Shea =

American ragtime composer (1931–1982)

Thomas William Shea (November 14, 1931 – March 12, 1982) was an American ragtime composer.

== Biography ==
Born in Mattoon, Illinois, Shea studied piano briefly as a child, but later became interested in ragtime after hearing the "Maple Leaf Rag." After learning some ragtime by ear, he started composing his own rags. His style has been informally called "Prairie Ragtime." He was active in ragtime circles in the Detroit area and expanded his exposure to ragtime and its proponents by attending ragtime festivals in St. Louis. In 1970, he moved to Raleigh, North Carolina. He is known to have composed over 20 rags, some of which are performed today ("Brun Campbell Express," "Rosebud Rag," "Corncracker Rag," "Little Wabash Special") and two of which were published ("Brun Campbell Express" in They All Played Ragtime, Oak Publications, New York, 1966; and "Trillium Rag" in Max Morath's Guide to Ragtime, Hollis Music, Inc., New York, 1964). He recorded three albums which contain his compositions: Classic and Modern Rags (Ragtime Society Records RSR-1, 1963), Prairie Ragtime (Ragtime Society Records RSR-2, 1964) and Little Wabash Special (Stomp Off Records, SOS-1022, 1982).

Shea died in Raleigh from a heart attack in March 1982. Asteroid 60614 Tomshea, discovered by astronomers with the Catalina Sky Survey in 2000, was named in his memory. The official naming citation was published by the Minor Planet Center on January 12, 2017 (M.P.C. 103026).

== Bibliography ==
- Jasen, David A., and Tichenor, Trebor Jay, Rags and Ragtime, Dover Publications, New York, 1978, pp. 282–284
- Blesh, Rudi, and Janis, Harriet, They All Played Ragtime, Oak Publications, New York, 4th edition, 1971, sheet music insert

== See also ==
- List of ragtime composers
