= Charlotte Blake =

American composer

Charlotte M. Blake
- Born: May 30, 1885; Ohio, United States
- Died: August 21, 1979 Santa Monica, California
- Genres: March, Ragtime, Waltz
- Occupations: Composer, Arranger, Pianist
- Years active: 1903–1919

Charlotte M. Blake (May 30, 1885 – August 21, 1979) was an American composer of waltzes, marches and ragtime.

Blake was the oldest of six children born to Edward and Caroline Blake of Ohio. At age 18, she got a job as a writer and arranger for Jerome H. Remick. Her first published composition, "King Cupid" appeared in 1903. After retiring from the music business, she worked as a clerk at Douglas Aircraft Company for two decades.

== List of compositions ==
In chronological order:

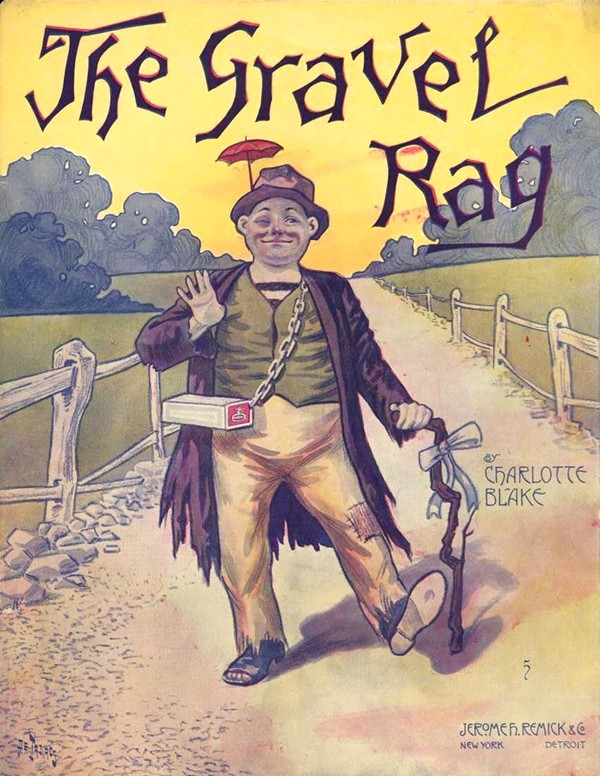
sheet music cover for "The Gravel Rag" (1908)

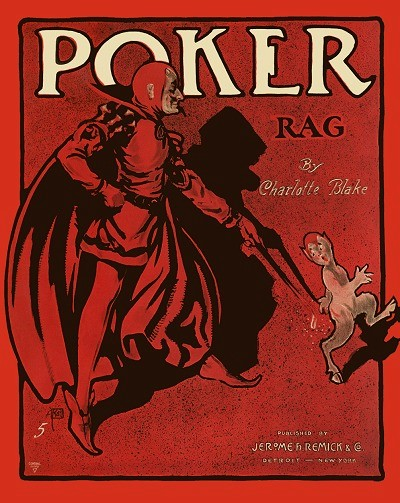
sheet music cover for "Poker Rag" (1909)

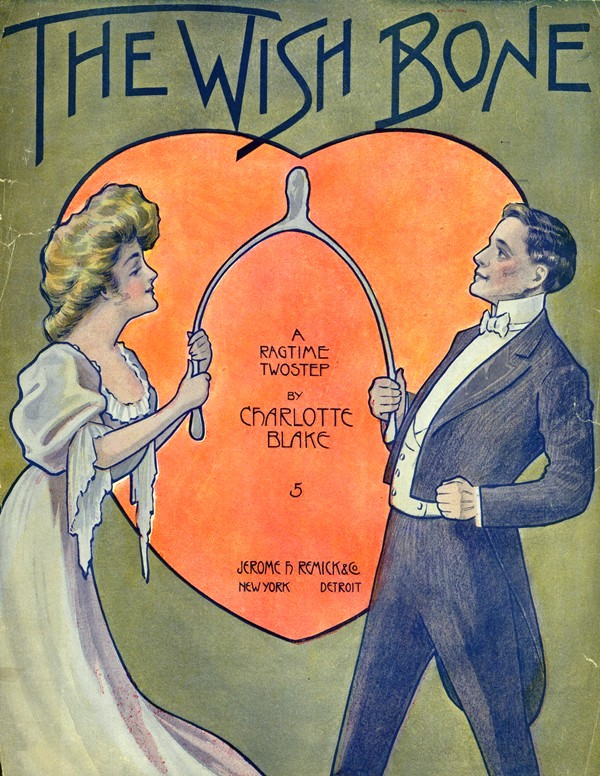
sheet music cover for "The Wish Bone" (1909)

- "King Cupid" (1903)
- "The Missouri Mule March" (1904)
- "Dainty Dames - A Novelette" (1905)
- "The Mascot" (march, 1905)
- "My Lady Laughter" (waltzes, 1905)
- "Love Is King" (waltzes, 1906)
- "Could You Read My Heart" (with words by Arthur Gillespie, 1906)
- "A Night, A Girl, A Moon" (1907)
- "Curly: March And Two Step" (1907)
- "Orchids, Novelette Three Step" (1907)
- "Hip Hip Hoorah" (march, 1907)
- "The Last Kiss" (waltzes, 1907)
- "I Wonder If It's You" (with words by Vincent P. Bryan, 1907)
- "Bogie Man - A Creep-Mouse Tune" (1907)
- "So Near and Yet So Far" (with Arthur Gillespie, 1907)
- "Love Tree" (1908)
- "The Gravel Rag" (1908)
- "In Mem'ry of You, Sweetheart" (song, with words by Arthur Gillespie, 1908)
- "It Makes A Lot Of Difference When You're With The Girl You Love" (song, with words by Arthur Gillespie and Harold Ward, 1909)
- "Poker Rag" (1909)
- "Honey When It's Sunny" (with words by Arthur Gillespie and Collin Davis, 1909)
- "The Wish Bone" (rag, 1909)
- "Lily Eyes: Valse Poetique" (1909)
- "Yankee Kid" (1909)
- "Honey Bug" (song, with words by Earle Clinton Jones, 1910)
- "Spoonlight" (with Earle Clinton Jones, 1910)
- "Tenderfoot" (with Earle Clinton Jones, 1910)
- "Bridal Veil" (waltzes, 1910)
- "You're a Classy Lassie" (with Earle Clinton Jones, 1910)
- "Love Ain't Likin', Likin' Ain't Love" (with Earle Clinton Jones, 1910)
- "Meet Me Half Way" (1910)
- "Miss Coquette" (1910)
- "Love's Dream of You" (with Earle Clinton Jones, 1910)
- "Roses Remind Me of You" (with Earle Clinton Jones, 1910)
- "The Road to Loveland" (with Earle Clinton Jones and Charles N. Daniels, 1911)
- "I Don't Need the Moonlight to Make Love to You" (with Francis X. Conlan, 1911)
- "That Tired Rag" (1911)
- "The Harbor of Love" (song, with words by Earle Clinton Jones, 1911)
- "Queen of the Roses" (1913)
- "Land of Beautiful Dreams" (with Maurice E. Marke, 1913)
- "Rose of the World" (with Richard W. Pascoe, 1915)
- "Honey When It's Money" (1919)

== See also ==
- List of ragtime composers
