= Theron C. Bennett =

American musician

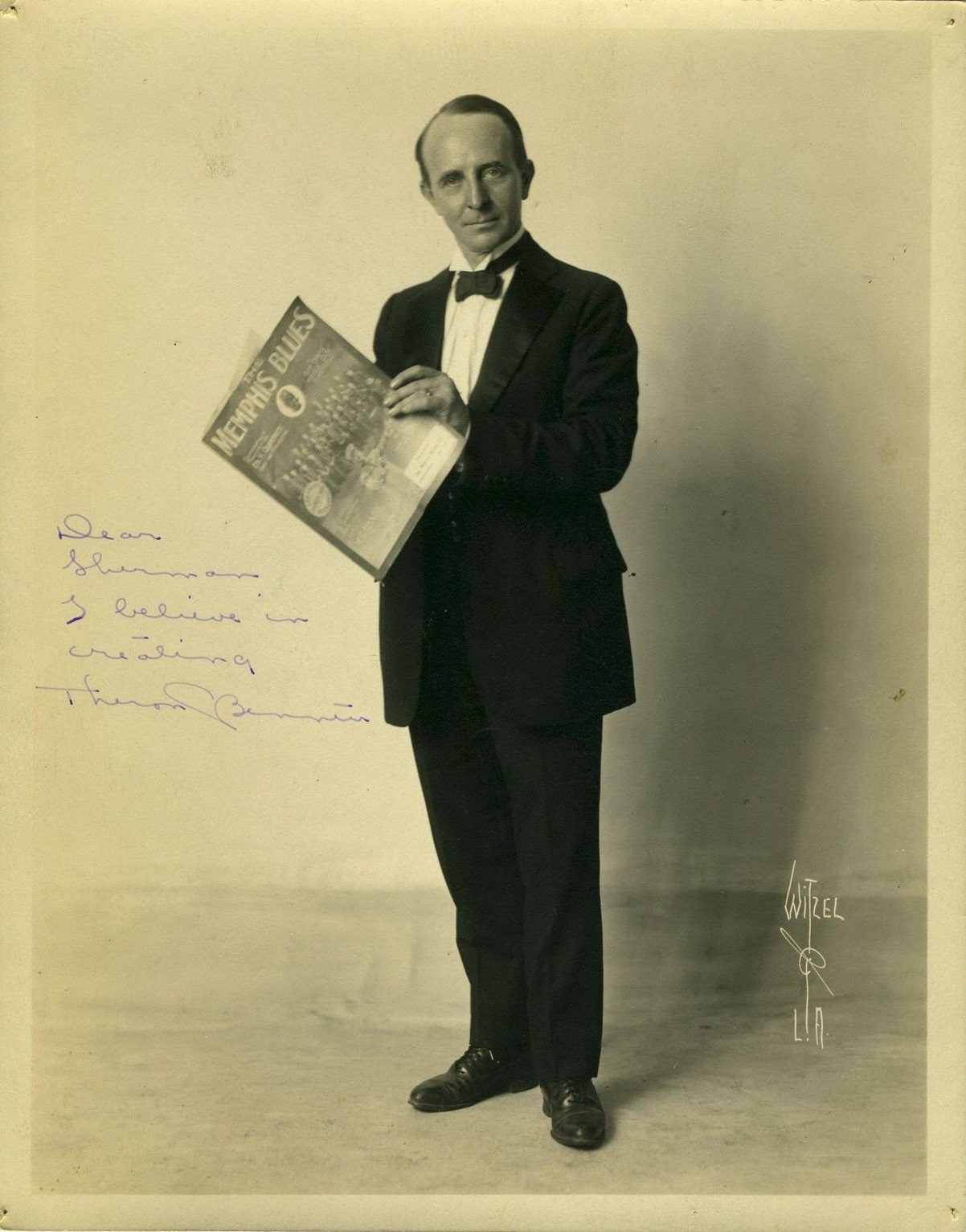
Theron C. Bennett ca. 1920.

Theron Catlen Bennett (July 9, 1879 – April 6, 1937) was an American pianist, ragtime composer, and music publisher.

Born in Pierce City, Missouri, he graduated in 1902 from the school which is now New Mexico State University. He worked for the Victor Kramer Co., which published some of his early compositions. He became a music publisher, and later owner of a chain of music stores. At one time he ran the Dutch Mill Cafe, a famous meeting place for musicians and artists in Denver, Colorado. In the early 1920s, he lived in the Los Angeles area, where he formed a jazz band made up of USC students. He died in Los Angeles.

== Selected compositions ==
- Pickaninny Capers (1903)
- St. Louis Tickle (1904) [as "Barney & Seymore", usually attributed to Bennett]
- Sweet Pickles (1907) [as George E. Florence]

== See also ==
- List of ragtime composers
