= Les C. Copeland =

Leslie Crawford Copeland
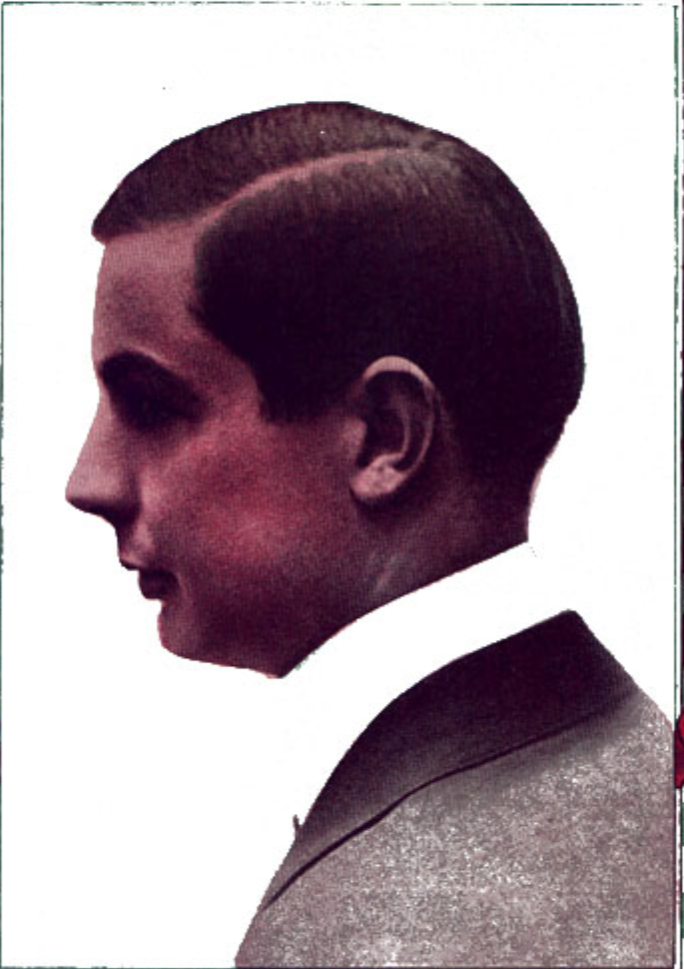
- Les Copeland as he appears on the cover of 38th Street Rag

Background information
- Born: Leslie C. Copeland; June 4, 1887; Wichita, Kansas, U.S.
- Died: March 3, 1942 (aged 54) San Francisco, California, U.S.
- Genres: Vaudeville, Ragtime
- Occupations: Composer and pianist
- Instrument: Piano
- Years active: 1909–1917

Leslie Crawford Copeland (June 4, 1887 – March 3, 1942) was an American composer and pianist. Leslie was the youngest of six children born to Willis Emerson Copeland and Fannie Amelia Searles. He was an acquaintance of S. Brunson Campbell, a white player who had studied under Scott Joplin in Sedalia, Missouri. In his late teens, he performed in Lew Dockstader's minstrel troupe, the Lew Dockstader Minstrels. At this same time, he would write three notable rags which were featured in the Minstrels: Cabbage Leaf Rag, Invitation Rag (containing heavy foreshadowing of the novelty piano genre), and the Dockstader Rag. He also wrote songs during this time. After 1912, Copeland left the Dockstader company and began performing in vaudeville, working for various companies including that of Benjamin Franklin Keith. During this time, he wrote several songs for vaudeville with lyricist Jean Havez. He also wrote his famous "38th Street Rag" in this period. Copeland continued performing, eventually contributing a song (I Ain't Married No More) to the Ziegfeld Follies of 1917. His work took him across the U.S. and parts of Europe, performing at various venues such as the New York Bar in New York City in 1922, The Jockey Club in Montparnasse in 1923, drawing crowds of up to four times the tiny building's capacity, and the Deauville Club in New York City in 1926. By 1930, Copeland remained in the U.S. on a more consistent basis, working in the music industry in Manhattan. Some newspapers state that "Les Copeland, former international cabaret pianist is in Wall Street", indicating that he may have dabbled in finances for a while, although this is unconfirmed. In 1933, he was confirmed to be back at work improvising at the piano in New York City nightclubs. Playing jobs were becoming scarce during the Great Depression for Copeland and others who didn't adapt to new forms of music. He ended up in San Francisco in the mid 1930s, enjoying the traditional jazz/ragtime revival thanks to the efforts of Lu Watters and Wally Rose a few years later. In the 1940 census, Copeland and his wife, Hazel, were listed as living on Montgomery Street, with Les working as a dramatic teacher. Copeland died in San Francisco at the age of 54 in 1942.

== Compositions ==
Les Copeland's playing and composing style was very distinctive, harkening back to the earliest days of ragtime. Many of his compositions are preserved on hand-played piano rolls, with four of his compositions originally existing only in this medium. One of Copeland's favorite "tricks" was the "thumping chord" effect, a trick derived from folk-style playing in which the left hand slides into a chord from one half-step below.

List of Compositions by Les Copeland
Year	Name	Collaborator	Piano Roll
1909	Cabbage Leaf Rag		
1911	Invitation Rag		MetroArt 200282 (1914)
1911	What the Engine Done		
1912	The Dockstader Rag		Uni-Record Melody 200363 (1913)
1912	Good Resolutions	Jean Havez	
1912	Honeymoon Days	Jean Havez	
1912	Melody Man	Jean Havez	
1912	Luxury	Neal O'Brien	
1913	38th Street Rag (a.k.a. Les Copeland's Rag)		Rolla Artis 50067 (1913); MetroArt 200296 (1914)
1913	42nd Street Rag	Jack Smith	
1913	How's Your Little Maltese Cat?	Lewis F. Muir	
1914	French Pastry Rag		MetroArt 202652 (1914)
1915	The Old Soaken Bucket		Universal 2021 (c.1915)
1916	Race Track Blues		MetroArt 200752 (c.1916)
1916	Rocky Mountain Fox		MetroArt 200725 (c.1916)
1916	Bees and Honey Rag		Universal 200759 (c.1916)
1916	Twist and Twirl Rag		MetroArt 200754 (c.1916)
1917	I Ain't Married No More	Rennold Wolf	
1917	Texas Blues		
1919	Save Your Money, John	Alex Rogers	
1925	Ivoryland		

== See also ==
- List of ragtime composers
