= Clarence C. Wiley =

American pharmacist and musician

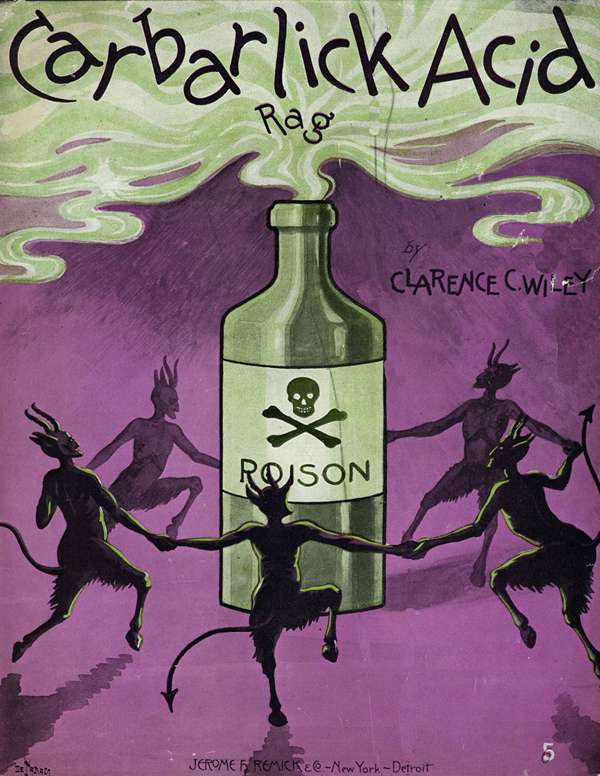
- cover art from Car-Balick-Acid sheet music, 1905 edition

Background information
- Born: Clarence C. Wiley; October 25, 1883; Bellaire, Ohio, U.S.
- Died: March 2, 1908
- Genres: Ragtime
- Occupations: Composer, store clerk, pharmacist
- Instrument: Piano

Clarence C. Wiley (October 25, 1883 – March 2, 1908) was an American pharmacist from Oskaloosa, Iowa, who won fame for his folk rag entitled "Car-Barlick-Acid Rag".

According to Census records, he was one of five children born to Benson and Ella Wiley.

Wiley copyrighted his composition on August 9, 1901. Giles Brothers purchased his rag in 1904 and sold it in turn to Jerome H. Remick and Company in 1907. It was published as sheet music and also in the form of a player piano roll.

He died in 1908 from a morphine overdose and was buried in Keokuk County, Iowa.

== See also ==
- List of ragtime composers
