= Theodore Havermeyer Northrup =

American composer

Theodore Havermeyer Northrup (1866–1919) composed one of the earliest rags, "Louisiana Rag", in 1897. The Thompson Music Company of Chicago in November, 1897 stated in a promo ad that it was "composed by Theo H. Northrup, the greatest living ragtime pianist. This piece has made an instantaneous hit and has become a great favorite everywhere." His other compositions in 1897 included "A Night on the Levee" and "Savannah Jubilee".

== Compositions ==
- Avon Waltzes (1887)
- La Tosca Waltzes (1889)

=== 1890 ===
- Just Ten

=== 1891 ===
- All the Go
- Two Happy Coons
- The Moon's Pale Light is Beaming

=== 1892 ===
- In the Ball Room: Schottische
- The Possum Patrol
- The Tennis Mazurka
- Dancing Waves
- Irene Slumbers, with W. Hill
- Turn Texas Loose, with C. C. DeZouche

=== 1893 ===
- The Angelus Bell
- Dolores
- In Lover's Lane, with E. Field
- The Flower Gardener Waltzes
- I'm A Sport

=== 1894 ===
- Carrie and Her Wheel
- A Kiss at Home
- The Waif on the Street
- Regret
- The Golden Gate Brigade: March
- The Loreley

=== 1895 ===
- The Golden Treasury of Music from the World's Famous Composers, compilation and arrangement
- Eaoline, with Louie Blosser
- Papa, Be Good to Mama
- Trilby
- Pat Wiley's Old Back Stoop, with William Lewis Elliot
- One Night, with Lawrence Oxenford
- Years Ago
- My Heart's Desire
- The Sweetest Girl in Town

=== 1896 ===
- My Eileen
- The Anvil of Blacksmith John
- It Is Better to Have Loved and Lost Than Ne'er to Have Loved at All, with Walter M. Auerbach
- The Palms
- Down in Maiden Lane, with Colin C. Hamand
- I Love You So
- Over The Fence Sweet Polly

=== 1897 ===
- Ben Harney's Ragtime Instructor, as arranger
- Savannah Jubilee Schottische
- A Night On The Levee
- Louisiana Rag (Pas Ma La)
- Only a Pair of Worn-Out Shoes, with William Fisher
- One Sweetly Solemn Thought
- Plantation Echoes
- Susanna from Savannah, with George Evans

=== 1898 ===
- Happy Hannah
- On the Bayou

=== 1899 ===
- I Cert'nly Was a Very Busy Man
- My Dearest Girl
- Virginia Capers
- After What He Done To Me, with Nellie Smith Ravell
- Where the Branches Kissed the River
- Chester and Dorothy, with William S. Lord
- The Lass and the Highland Plaid
- Sue, Ma Sue, with Charles W. Doty
- Over the Hills to Jersey

=== 1900 ===
- Dost Thou Remember
- Loquatias Moll
- Suzanne from Gay Paree, with Harry Werner
- I'm Glad to See You're Back, with Will D. Cobb
- Pucker Up Your Lips Miss Lucy
- A Good Run's Better Than a Bad Stand
- The Conjure Man
- When I'se By Her Side
- She's Ma Little Sugar Plum
- My Little Jungle Queen: A Congo Love
- She's the Real Thing My Baby
- Lou Lou: Sérénade

=== 1901 ===
- United Confederate Veterans (U.C.V.) March
- Gladys
- Parthenia

=== 1902 ===
- Polly Pry
- Silas and the New York Girl
- Lucy
- The Broadway Brigade

=== 1906 ===
- Uncle Sammy

=== 1914 ===
- In the Forest

=== 1915 ===
- Sometimes in Dreams

== See also ==
- List of ragtime composers

== Sources ==
- Blesh, Rudi, and Janis, Harriett. They All Played Ragtime (New York 1950).
- Terry Waldo, This is Ragtime, 1991.
