= Heliotrope Bouquet =

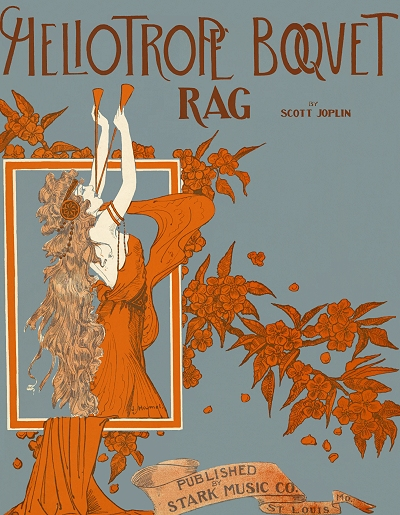
- Sheet music cover, 1907

Song
- Released: 1907
- Genre: Ragtime
- Composers: Scott Joplin and Louis Chauvin

"Heliotrope Bouquet" is a 1907 rag composed by Scott Joplin and Louis Chauvin. The first section of the piece is unique in ragtime for its structure, rhythm and melody. Music historian Bill Edwards has speculated that this and the second section were most likely contributed by Chauvin, while the third and fourth sections show Joplin's style of composing.

== See also ==
- List of compositions by Scott Joplin
