= Charles Hunter (composer) =

American ragtime composer

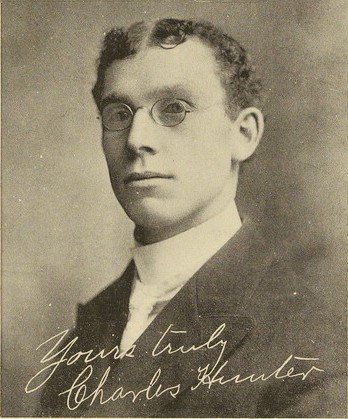
Charles Hunter (ragtime composer)

Charles H. Hunter (May 16, 1876 – January 23, 1906) was an American composer of ragtime music.

== Early life and education ==
Charles Hunter was born in Columbia, Tennessee, and at birth was almost totally blind. He was the son of Jordan M. Hunter and Fannie F. Hackney. His father was a musician in the 6th Cavalry of the Confederate army during the American Civil War. Hunter attended the School for the Blind in Nashville, Tennessee, where he learned the piano tuner's trade. He went to work at the Jesse French Piano Company in Nashville.

== Career ==
Absorbing the folk strains of Nashville, Hunter published his first rag, "Tickled to Death", in 1899, which became a hit. This was followed in 1900 by "A Tennessee Tantilizer," and in 1901 by "Possum and Taters," "Cotton Bolls," and "Queen of Love."

In 1902 he transferred to Jesse French's St. Louis store. "Just Ask Me" was published that year, and "Why We Smile" the next.

Hunter's health and career deteriorated as he partook of the St. Louis night life, and it was not until late in 1905 that he published his final rag, "Back to Life," so named to celebrate his return to health. It was a short-lived recovery; he died of tuberculosis not long afterwards. According to his funeral notice in the Columbia Herald, he left a young wife. He died on January 23, 1906, just six weeks after his marriage.

== See also ==
- List of ragtime composers
