= Swipesy Cakewalk =

1900 Ragtime composition by Scott Joplin

Swipesy
- by Scott Joplin and Arthur Marshall
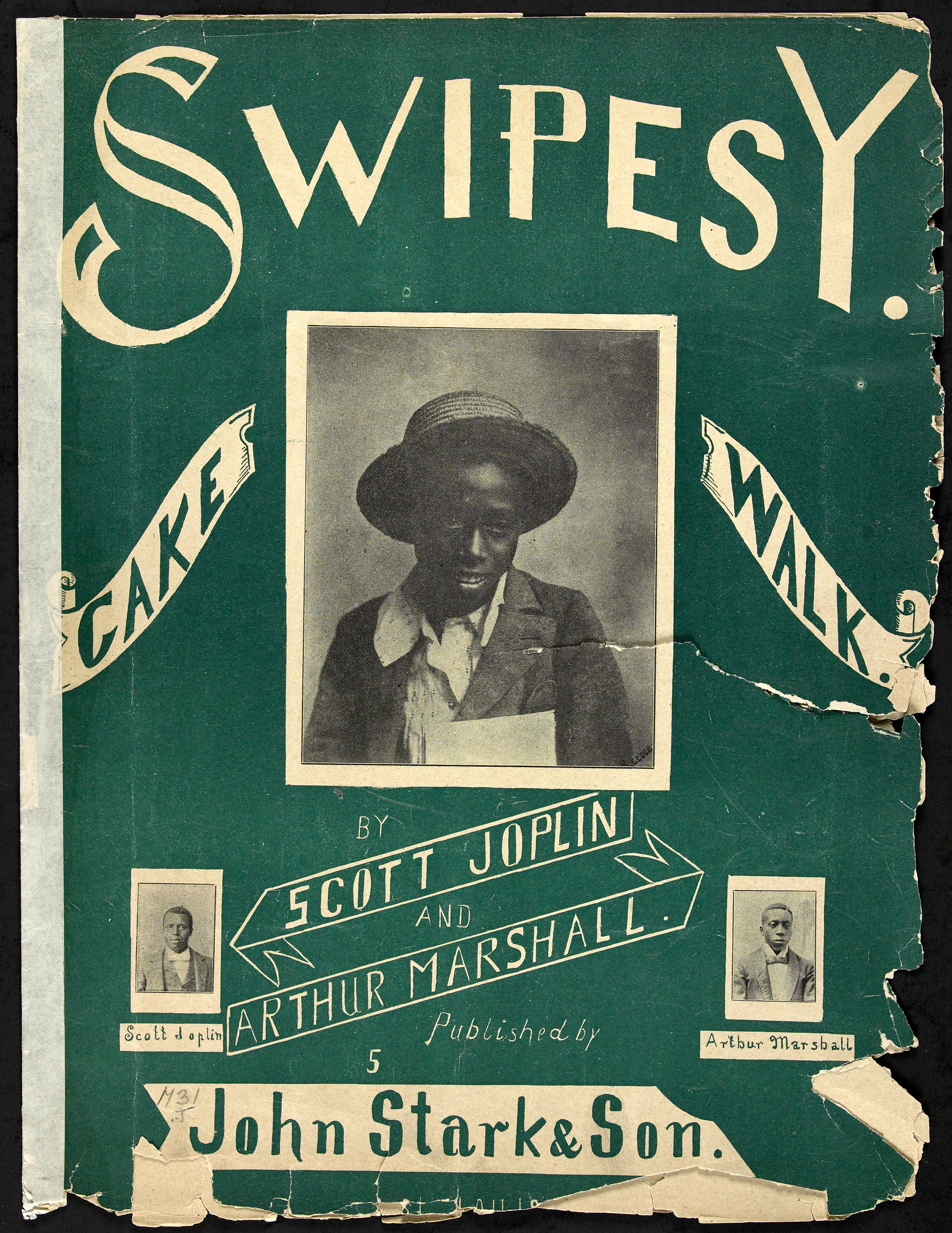
- Cover of the sheet music, 1900
- Genre: Ragtime
- Form: Cakewalk
- Published: 1900
- Publisher: John Stark & Son
- Instrument: Piano Solo

The "Swipesy Cakewalk" is a ragtime composition published in 1900 by a musical duo consisting of Scott Joplin, who likely composed the trio, and the young composer Arthur Marshall, who most probably composed the rest of the piece with oversight from Joplin. "Swipesy" uses the simple syncopations of a cakewalk - the first beat being a sixteenth, eighth, sixteenth note division, and the second beat an even eighth note division. The style follows the AA BB A CC DD musical form common for both cakewalks and rags, particularly after the earlier publication of Joplin's hit "Maple Leaf Rag". Although called a cakewalk, it departs from the cakewalk form in favor of the more standard ragtime idiom at various points, most notably throughout the C (Trio) section. "Swipesy" was most likely written in the late 1890s when Joplin was living with the Marshall family and teaching Arthur composition.

"Swipesy" begins with a four-measure introduction in B♭ major (two flats). It modulates to E♭ major (three flats) for the trio (C) section, returning to B♭ for the final (D) section. It is thought that Joplin wrote the trio and Marshall wrote the A, B and D strains.

A popular legend says that the title was suggested by John Stillwell Stark, one of Joplin's original publishers, when "Swipesy" was first being considered for publication. The photograph which was to appear on the cover of the new (and unnamed) composition featured a young Sedalia newsboy with a shy expression on his face. Stark allegedly remarked that the boy's countenance seemed to suggest that he had just "swiped" something from a cookie jar. "Lets call [the tune] 'Swipesy'," said Stark, and thus the title was decided. Marshall gave another explanation of the title's origin during a 1960 interview: he and Joplin had just delivered the music to Stark's office when two newspaper boys began quarreling outside, one swiped a newspaper from the other, and Stark, upon observing this, suggested that they name the work "Swipesy".

The copyright for this piece was registered on July 21, 1900.

== See also ==
- List of compositions by Scott Joplin
