= Adaline Shepherd =

American piano composer

Adaline Shepherd (August 19, 1883 – March 12, 1950) was an American composer of piano pieces. Though she did not compose many pieces, the pieces she composed were popular. In her twenties, she composed three ragtime pieces: "Pickles and Peppers" (1906), "Wireless Rag" (1909), and "Live Wires Rag" (1910). Commemorating World War I, she also published "Victory" (1918). She married Frederick Sherman Olson in 1910, and thereafter used his last name as her own.

After her marriage, she retired from composition, and her compositions were unknown to her remaining family by the 1970s until they were contacted by reporters.

== See also ==
- List of ragtime composers
