= Robert Morrison Stults =

American songwriter

Robert Morrison Stults (1861–1933) was an American composer of popular music in the late 19th century and early 20th century. He used aliases such as Norwood Dale and S. M. Roberts for some of his works.

Stults wrote the musical The Cross Patch Fairies. His most popular work, "The Sweetest Story Ever Told", was published in 1892 and was still popular into the 20th century.

According to the Morrison family history, Stults was the son of Jacob Stults and Martha-Jane Morrison. The first of five children, he was born on June 1, 1861, in Hightstown, New Jersey. He was married to Julia Vandermeer.

Prior to 1910, Stults mostly wrote popular music, but later wrote more sacred music and bigger works. Stults wrote three ragtime tunes, "Smoky Sam" (1898), "Walkin' on de Rainbow Road" (1899), and "A Moonlight Meander]" (1900), under the name S. M. Roberts (a play on his name Robert M. Stults). "A Moonlight Meander", was copyrighted by his wife, J. V. Stults, who often copyrighted his music.

At his death on March 24, 1933, Stults was the co-publisher of the Long Branch Daily Record in Long Branch, New Jersey.

This is a list of works that are mostly songs and piano tunes, written prior to 1910:

Title	Type	Copyright
A Dutch Lullaby	Song	1909
A Little Choir Boy's Song	Song	1894
A Little Dresden Shepherdess-Caprice	Piano	1899
A Message in My Dream	Song	1906
A Moonlight Meander	Piano	1900
Academic March	Piano	1885
Again	Song	1901
American National Anthems	Song	1918
America's Golden Rod: National Song & Chorus		1890
Among the Hills of Maryland	Tenor	1899
Aristocrat March	Piano	
As the Days Go By		1904
Avenge the Good Ship Maine	Song	1898
Battle Monument Waltz	Piano	1878
Because I Know Your Heart Is Warm and True		
Because You Told Me So	Song	1897
Beloved	Song	1910
Birds in the Meadow	Piano	1917
Born at Sea and a Sailor	Song	1898
Breathe Those Tender Words Again	Song	1895
Bull Frogs' Dance	Piano	1906
Bulls and Bears March	Piano	1901
Cheer Up, Sweetheart	Song	1893
Clover Bloom		1905
Dolly Doe	Song	1898
Drum-Beat March	Piano	1893
Fancies		1894
For Loves’ Sweet Sake	Song	1910
He Told Her That He Loved Her	Song	1896
Hollywood Waltzes	Piano	1885
Hope on, Sweetheart		1901
I Am a Yale Girl	Soprano	1896
I Know You'll Not Forget Me		1899
I Love Her All Day Long	Tenor	1895
I Love Thee So	Song	1909
I Love You Dear	Song	1920
I Love You Now	Song	1896
I Want to See the Old Folks Again	Song	1918
I Wonder If You Ever Think of Me	Song	1901
If Dreams Were Only True	Tenor	1902
I'll Always Think of You	Song	1900
In the Golden Long Ago	Song	1897
In the Twilight Glow	Song	1908
Joan of Arc	Piano	1895
Just One Little Look of Love	Song	1900
King of Clubs		1907
Kiss and Say Goodnight	Tenor	1898
Let Me Call You "Dearie"	Tenor	1910
Light	Song	1908
Listen While I Tell You, Dear	Song	1898
Little Jack Horner Caprice	Piano	1893
Little Song for You		1904
Long Wave Old Glory	Song	1917
Love Me Again		1910
Loves Sweet Story	Tenor	1891
M A C March	Piano	1897
Madrienne	Tenor	1891
Memories	Song	1907
Mona Lee	Song	1909
Monumental City	Piano	1895
My Clementine	Tenor	1890
My Heart Is Yours Forever	Song	1896
My Heart's Desire I Find in You	Song	1913
My Little Red Rose Goodnight	Tenor	1897
My Little Yaller Coon, Good Night	Song	1896
My Mothers Favorite Hymn	Song	1892
No Sweeter Words Were Ever Said	Song	1897
Nonsense Song: A Travesty	Song	1917
Once in the Bygone Days	Song	1906
Only Dreaming	Song	1909
Our Orioles March	Piano	1894
Papa's Lullaby		1897
Philadelphia March		
Philopena March	Piano	
Pictures in the Fire	Song	1895
Pretty Bright Flowers for Thee	Tenor	1888
Redemption	Tenor	1902
Revel of the Brownies		
Shine on, Mister Moon	Song	1910
Sing Me a Song of the Olden Time	Song	1912
Sing Me an Old Sweet Song of Love	Song	1911
Sing Me Some Quaint Old Ballad	Song	1908
Sing Once Again, Sweet Bird	Song	1891
Smoky Sam	Piano	1898
Song for My Little Maid		
St Valentines March	Piano	1899
Stand by the Flag Patriotic March	Piano	1917
Sweet Dreams to You	Song	1912
Sweet Marjorie	Song	1899
Sweet Red Roses	Song	1900
Take Me Back to Dear Old Dixie	Song	1910
That Song Divine		
The Advance Guard March	Piano	1892
The Ballet of the Birds	Piano	1904
The Birds and the Brook	Piano	1893
The Birds Ball	Piano	1911
The Old First Love Is Best of All	Song	1896
The Old Home I Loved Long Years Ago	Song	1899
The Old Sentinel March	Piano	1885
The Patrician Valse	Piano	1907
The Song I Heard Last Night	Song	1893
The Star Spangled Banner Patriotic March	Piano	1898
The Sweetest Little Girl I Know	Tenor	1894
The Sweetest Story Ever Told	Song	1892
The Sweetest Words of All	Tenor	1922
The Words That Made You Mine	Tenor	1900
Under the Stars I Met You Love	Tenor	1899
Walkin' on de Rainbow Road	Piano	1899
Watermelon Dance (Shuffle)	Piano	1893
Way Down South in Dixie	Song	1903
When I Was a Boy Like You	Song	1893
When the Twilight Softly Falls	Song	1908
Whisper	Song	1900
White Swan Schottische	Piano	1900
Won't You Love Me As of Old	Song	1898
Yes, I Love You	Soprano	1893
You, Just You	Song	1910

This is a list of works that are sacred in nature or longer works. These were generally written after 1910:

Title	Type	Copyright
A Pickaninny Lullaby		1915
A Song of Spring	Song	1915
A Song of the Sea	Choral	1918
A Tale of a Duck	Song	1920
A Travesty	Song	1920
All for Freedom	Piano	1918
All Hail the Glorious Morn!		1918
Alleluia!	Cantata	1923
Alleluia! Alleluia!		1916
Alleluia! He Is Risen	Anthem	1923
And When the Sabbath Was Past	Anthem	1914
Andante in G	Organ	1932
Angels from the Realms of Glory		1919
Angels of Jesus		1917
As It Began to Dawn	Anthem	1915
At the Lamb's High Feast We Sing	Anthem	1920
Awake, Thou that Sleepest	Anthem	1922
Belshazzar: Sacred Cantata	Cantata	1925
Benedictus es Domine		1922
Betty Lou, "The Dream Girl"	Operetta	1928
Birthday of the King	Cantata	1929
Bit of Nonsense	Piano	1911
Bless the Lord, O My Soul	Anthem	1922
Blushing Roses	Piano	1912
Bound for Home March	Piano	1919
Break Forth into Joy	Anthem	1917
Bright May Morning	Song	1923
Brooklet's Song	Song	1924
Calm on the list'ning ear of Night	Anthem	1920
Children of the Heavenly King	Song	1920
Christ Our Passover		1923
Christ Triumphant	Cantata	1923
Christians, Awake, Salute the Happy Morn		1915
Come Hither, Ye Faithful		1916
Come Holy Spirit, Come	Anthem	1922
Come Unto Me, Ye Weary	Hymn	1914
Come Ye Faithful, Raise the Strain		1916
Come Ye Thankful People, Come	Anthem	1922
Come, Gracious Spirit	Anthem	1921
Crossing the Bar	Anthem	1922
Crown Him Lord of All		1943?
Crown Him with Many Crowns	Hymn	1920
Dance of the Fireflies	Piano	1913
Dawn of Hope	Service	1911
De Old Plantation		1917
Down the Raging Bay	Burlesque	1919
Dream of the Past	Song	1924
Ebbing and Flowing	Song	1923
Eventide	Anthem	1920
Father of Mercies	Hymn	1922
Fight the Good Fight	Hymn	1914
Flow, Lightly Flow	Song	1923
Folderol: Musical Farce	Musical	1926
From Death unto Life: Easter	Cantata	1921
Give Peace, O God, Give Peace Again	Hymn	1918
Glad Tidings	Cantata	1922
Glory Crowns the Victor's Brow	Anthem	1921
Glory to God	Song	1911
Glory to God in the Highest	Anthem	1915
God of Mercy, God of Grace	Anthem	1929
God, My King, Thy Might Confessing	Anthem	1923
God, That Madest Earth and Heaven	Anthem	1920
God's Will	Song	1927
Gone Where the Woodbine Twineth	Song	1924
Great Is the Lord	Anthem	1921
Hail Glorious Day	Anthem	1923
Hail to the Lord's Anointed	Anthem	1914
Hark! Hark! The Notes of Joy		1916
Hark! What Mean Those Holy Voices?		1915
He Is Risen		1916
He Shall Be Great	Anthem	1921
Hear My Cry, O God	Anthem	1923
Hearts and Blossoms	Operetta	1925
Heaven's Melodious Strains	Anthem	1922
Holy Ghost, with Light Divine	Anthem	1924
How Sweet the Name of Jesus Sounds	Duet	1921
I Am the Resurrection and the Life	Anthem	1917
I Love Thy Kingdom, Lord	Hymn	1914
I Think of Thee	Song	1908
I Will Praise Thee, O Lord	Anthem	1913
Idyllic Tone Pictures	Piano	1916
Immanuel	Cantata	1928
Immortality: Easter cantata	Cantata	1917
In Fields and Woods	Piano	1919
In the Cross of Christ I Glory	Song	1911
In the End of the Sabbath	Anthem	1923
In the Hour of Trial	Duet	1917
In the Rose Garden	Song	1911
In the Starlight	Song	1924
Invocation to Summer	Duet	1915
Is It for Me?	Song	1924
Jerusalem the Golden: Quarter for Men	Song	1917
Jesus, Lover of My Soul	Hymn	1924
Jesus, Merciful and Mild	Song	1912
Jesus, Savior, Hold My Hand	Song	1911
Jesus, Still Lead On	Song	1909
Jolly Old Winter		1924
Jolly Tars		1923
Joy and Gladness	Duet	1933
Joy of Christmas	Cantata	1911
Jubilate Deo in E flat	Anthem	1914
Just As I Am	Hymn	1918
King All Glorious		1923
King Immanuel	Cantata	1925
King of Kings and Lord of All	Cantata	1923
Lead Thou Me on	Song	1924
Lead Us, Heavenly Father	Song	1918
Lead Us, O Father	Song	1916
Lead, Kindly Light	Hymn	1913
Let's Go!	Burlesque	1924
Light and Life: Easter	Cantata	1942?
Light at Evening Time	Anthem	1913
Light of Light that Shineth	Anthem	1916
Little Girl in a Calico Gown	Song	1922
Little Miss Muffett	Travesty	1922
Lord God, We Worship Thee!		1915
Lord, Forever at Thy Side	Song	1919
Magnificat (Nunc dimittis) in F	Choral	1913
May-time	Song	1923
Medley of Irish Songs: 3-part women	Song	1922
Miss Polly's Patchwork Quilt	Operetta	
My Evening Song	Sacred	1923
My Soul, Be on Thy Guard	Hymn	1922
Nature Song	Song	1924
Night Song: Reverie	Piano	1913
Nightfall	Song	1910
Nonsense Song	Travesty	1917
Now Upon the First Day of the Week		1916
O Holy Babe of Bethlehem	Song	1922
O Holy Child of Bethlehem	Song	1918
O King of Saints	Anthem	1922
O Lamb of God	Choral	1913
O Lamb of God, Still Keep Me	Song	1911
O Little Babe of Bethlehem	Anthem	1905
O Little Town of Bethlehem	Anthem	1920
O Lord of Hosts, Almighty King	Anthem	1918
O Lord, My Trust Is in Thy Mercy	Anthem	1922
O Praise the Lord, etc.	Anthem	1914
O Saviour, Previous Saviour	Hymn	1923
O Sing Unto the Lord	Anthem	1922
Of the Father's Love Begotten	Anthem	1915
Offertoire in Ab	Organ	1918
Oh, Could I Speak the Matchless Worth	Hymn	1921
Old King Cole	Song	1923
Open My Eyes, O Lord	Sacred	1923
Orchids: Caprice	Piano	1919
Our Day of Praise Is Done	Hymn	1920
Over the Waves We Softly Glide	Song	1915
Praise to God, Immortal Praise		1923
Praise Ye the Lord		1918
Prelude in Ab	Organ	1919
Processional March	Organ	1918
Progress and Pleasure	Piano	1919
Redemption's Triumph Song	Anthem	1929
Rejoice, Ye Pure in Heart	Hymn	1922
Reve D'Amour: for soft stops	Organ	1924
Rock of Ages	Hymn	1914
Saviour Whom I Fain Would Love		1917
Saviour, Breathe and Evening Blessing	Anthem	1921
Send Out the Glad Tidings	Anthem	1922
Shepherd, with Thy Tenderest Love	Anthem	1926
Short Communion Service in F		1924
Sing Again That Song to Me		1920
Sing with All the Sons of Glory	Anthem	1923
Sing, My Soul, His wondrous Love	Hymn	1923
Sing, O Heavens		1918
Sleep, Dearie Sleep	Song	1908
Sleep, Little Babe	Song	1919
Softly Fades the Twilight Ray	Anthem	1922
Softly Now the Light of Day		1920
Song of the Mocking Bird	Song	1922
Song of the Snowflakes	Song	1922
Spirit Divine, Attend Our Prayers, etc.	Anthem	1914
Springtime Fantasy	Song	1924
Still, Still with Thee	Sacred	1914
Suffer Little Children	Anthem	1912
Summer Song	Song	1922
Summer Travesty	Travesty	1924
Sun of My Soul	Hymn	1921
Sunlight Land	Song	1908
Te Deum in E flat, etc.	Sacred	1914
That Glorious Song of Old	Song	1922
That Sweet Story of Old	Hymn	1920
The Angelic Message		1918
The Choir Angelic	Sacred	1907
The Coming of the King	Anthem	1914
The Console: Voluntaries	Organ	1923
The CrossPatch Fairies, Xmas for kids	Musical	1924
The Day is Past and Over	Hymn	1916
The Flapper Is a Good Pal After All		1929
The Fountain	Song	1924
The Gift Divine	Cantata	1920
The Herald Angels	Cantata	1922
The King Cometh	Cantata	1916
The Light of the Morning	Duet	1915
The Living Christ: Easter	Cantata	1923
The Lord Is King	Hymn	1922
The Lord Is My Strength		1916
The Lord Is Risen Indeed	Anthem	1925
The Lord Reigneth		1918
The Morning Light Is Breaking	Anthem	1922
The Office of the Holy Communion in G		1922
The Promised Child	Cantata	1924
The Resurrection	Anthem	1919
The Resurrection Song	Song	1913
The Risen Lord	Cantata	1921
The Song the Angels Sang	Song	1908
The Springtime of My Heart		1926
The Story of Christmas	Cantata	1915
The Story of Easter	Cantata	1916
The Voice Triumphant	Song	1905
The Watchful Shepherds	Anthem	1919
The Woman of Endor	Cantata	1925
The Wondrous Light: Christmas	Cantata	1917
The Wondrous Story	Song	1916
The World of To-morrow	Song	1912
The World's True Light	Cantata	1932
There Were Shepherds	Anthem	1913
There's a Longin' in My Heart: Down in Carolina		1920
They Shall Not Hunger Nor Thirst	Anthem	1920
Thinking of Thee	Piano	1919
Thou Art the Way	Song	1920
Thy Way, Not Mine, O Lord	Hymn	1918
Toccatina	Piano	1927
Triumphant Sion, Lift Thy Head	Anthem	1921
We'll Bring Our Heroes Home	Song	1919
What Are These Which Are Arrayed in White Robes!		1915
When at Thy Footstool, Lord I Bend	Hymn	1922
When Christ Was Born	Song	1920
Where the Buttercups Grew	Song	1916
Yellow Pansy	Song	1924
You Are the Light of My Life	Song	1910

== See also ==
- List of ragtime composers
