= Arthur Marshall (composer) =

American composer and performer

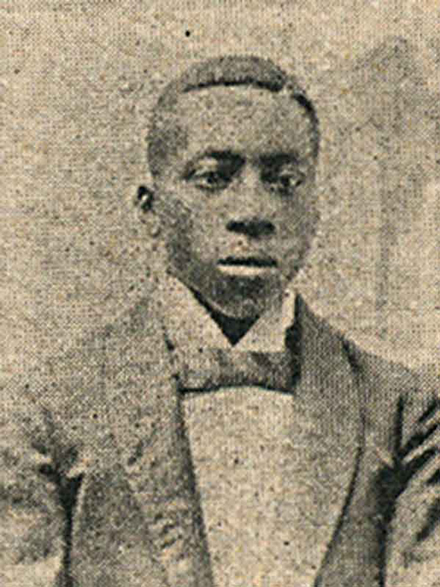

Background information
- Born: Arthur Owen Marshall; November 20, 1881; Saline County, Missouri, U.S.
- Died: August 18, 1968 (aged 86) Kansas City, Missouri, U.S.
- Genres: Ragtime
- Occupations: Composer, pianist
- Instrument: Piano

Arthur Owen Marshall (November 20, 1881 – August 18, 1968) was an American composer and performer of ragtime music from Missouri. He was a protege of famed ragtime composer Scott Joplin.

== Early life and education ==
Marshall was born on a farm in Saline County, Missouri, the son of Emily Marshall, a washerwoman, and Edward Marshall, who had no discernible career, on November 20, 1881. A few years later his family moved to Sedalia, Missouri because black children were allowed to attend school nine months a year there as opposed to the three months allowed blacks elsewhere, and the Sedalia townspeople were reportedly more accepting of African Americans. The Marshalls lived at 135 West Henry Street. Marshall attended elementary school in Sedalia. He was only fifteen years old when Scott Joplin first arrived in Sedalia. Joplin took up residence with the Marshall family, and before long both Marshall and Scott Hayden, a Lincoln High School classmate of Marshall, became Joplin's protégés. Marshall had already taken some private lessons in classical music years before, and was versed with piano technique and a gift for syncopation. Joplin also helped get Marshall a job at the Maple Leaf Club during its single year of existence in 1899. In the club on October 1, 1899, Marshall got into a fight with a young man named Ernst Edwards over Edwards's girlfriend. They took their fight outside, Marshall pummeled Edwards with his cane, Edwards drew a gun, and Marshall ran away.

== Career ==
Marshall's 1908 "Ham And!"

Marshall's 1908 "The Peach"

Marshall being interviewed at a ragtime festival in 1959 and playing some of his music on a piano afterwards

At Joplin's suggestion, Marshall then continued to study music at George R. Smith College, learning music theory. Marshall graduated from the Teacher's Institute with a teaching license, however, it seems that he chose to pursue a career as a performer. He earned a reputation as an outstanding local musician. While still in college, he traveled with McCabe's Minstrels for nearly two years, playing during intermissions. Marshall also helped cover his school expenses by playing ragtime in public venues and for dances and special occasions. He also played where work was available; in the brothels, where substantial tips regularly exceeded his standard wage by a great deal.

During 1901 and 1902, Marshall lived in the Joplin home in St. Louis, along with Scott Hayden, Hayden's wife Nora, Joplin's wife Belle, and Joplin's brother Will. During this time, Nora and Will died.

Marshall continued to play in various tours and contests, both in St. Louis and at places such as Chicago. In 1903, despite flagrant racial discrimination, Marshall worked at the Louisiana Purchase Exposition (St. Louis World's Fair), playing piano at the Spanish Cafe where he earned $12 per week plus tips until he was replaced by a band. At some point after mid-1905, he moved with his wife to Chicago. They lived in an apartment at 2900 South State Street above Beau Baum's Saloon, across the street from the Pekin Theater. Marshall played at several local spots; the Wintergarden at 3047 South State Street, Lewis's Saloon and the Eureka Saloon.

Marshall collaborated with Scott Joplin on two ragtime compositions, "Swipesy Cake Walk" (copyrighted July 21, 1900) and "The Lily Queen" (copyrighted November 7, 1907), and produced several solo efforts, including "Kinklets", "Ham and !", and "The Peach". It appears that for these three solo compositions Marshall received $50 and 3-cent royalties from his publisher John Stillwell Stark, a deal which Marshall felt was fair. However, he struggled to come to terms with Stark in 1906, possibly for his rag "The Pippin", and finally settled on a non-royalty offer of $10 and 200 copies of the music.

== Later life and death ==
Marshall retired from the music business in 1917, but later in life he participated in ragtime revivals. Arthur Marshall died in Kansas City, Missouri.

== Personal life ==
Marshall apparently married four times during his life.

- Latisha (or Letitia) Howell, in St. Louis circa 1904
- Maude McMannes, in St. Louis
- Julia Jackson, in Chicago, with whom he had three children, two girls (one being Mildred Steward) and one boy. Julia died in childbirth in 1916.
- Odell Dillard (Childs), in Kansas City on November 25, 1919

== List of compositions ==
Title	Year	Comments
"Swipesy Cakewalk"	1900	With Scott Joplin
"Kinklets"	1906	
"Lily Queen"	1907	By Marshall, edited by Joplin
"Missouri Romp"	1907	
"Ham and !"	1908	
"The Peach"	1908	
"The Glory of the Cubs"	1908	
"The Pippin"	1908	
"Silver Arrow Rag"	1949	
"National Prize Rag"	1950	
"Century Prize"	c. 1966	
"Silver Rocket"	c. 1966	
"I'll Wait Until My Dream Girl Comes Again"	1974	Published posthumously
"Little Jack's Rag"	1976	Published posthumously
"The Miracle of a Birth"	1980	Published posthumously

== See also ==
- List of ragtime composers
