= Tom Turpin =

American composer of ragtime music (1871–1922)

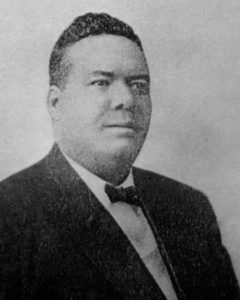
Tom Turpin

The Buffalo Rag
Tom Turpin's 1904 composition "The Buffalo Rag", in a 1906 performance by Vess L. Ossman

Thomas Million John Turpin (November 18, 1871(?) – August 13, 1922) was an American composer of ragtime music. Turpin is credited with the first published rag by an African American, his "Harlem Rag" of 1897 (although it was composed by 1892, a year before ragtime's introduction to the world at the 1893 World's Fair).

== Biography ==
Tom Turpin was born in Savannah, Georgia, a son of John L. Turpin and Lulu Waters Turpin. In his early twenties, he opened a saloon in St. Louis which became a meeting-place for local pianists, such as Joe Jordan and Scott Joplin, and an incubation point for early folk ragtime. This saloon, named the Rosebud Café, became the namesake of Joplin's "Rosebud March" (1905). The saloon was closed in 1906.

Including the "Harlem Rag", Turpin published a total of seven compositions. Two were recorded by contemporary musicians: St. Louis Rag (1903) was recorded most notably by the United States Marine Band and Arthur Pryor's Orchestra in 1906, and Buffalo Rag (1904), was recorded by Vess L. Ossman.

Turpin was a large man, six feet (1.83 m) tall and 300 pounds (136 kg); his piano had to be raised on blocks so that he could play it standing up, otherwise his stomach would get in the way. In addition to his saloon-keeping duties and his ragtime composition, he controlled (with his brother Charles) a theater, gambling houses, dance halls, and sporting houses. He served as a deputy constable and was one of the first politically powerful African-Americans in St. Louis. His influence on local music earned him the title "Father of St. Louis Ragtime."

Turpin died of peritonitis in 1922.

=== Date of birth ===
Turpin's date of birth is uncertain; both 1871 and 1873 appear in published sources. His gravestone says simply 1871. The 1900 Federal Census for the city of St. Louis (Enumeration District 220, Sheet 9, Line 79) listed his birthdate as "November 1871", but on his draft registration card he wrote November 18, 1874. However, some historians believe he was born in 1873.

== In popular culture ==
He was portrayed by Godfrey Cambridge in the 1977 film Scott Joplin.

He is a minor character in Philip José Farmer's Riverworld book series.

== List of compositions ==
1897

- Harlem Rag - Two Step

1899

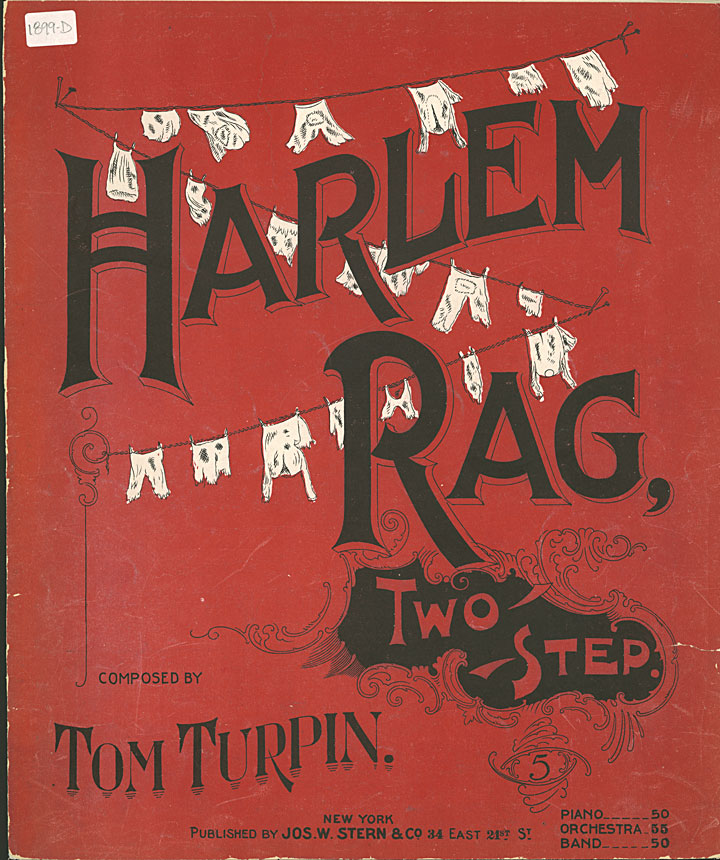
'Harlem Rag' 1899 edition sheet music cover

- Harlem Rag [arranged by Will Tyers]
- Bowery Buck - Ragtime Two Step

1900

- Ragtime Nightmare

1903

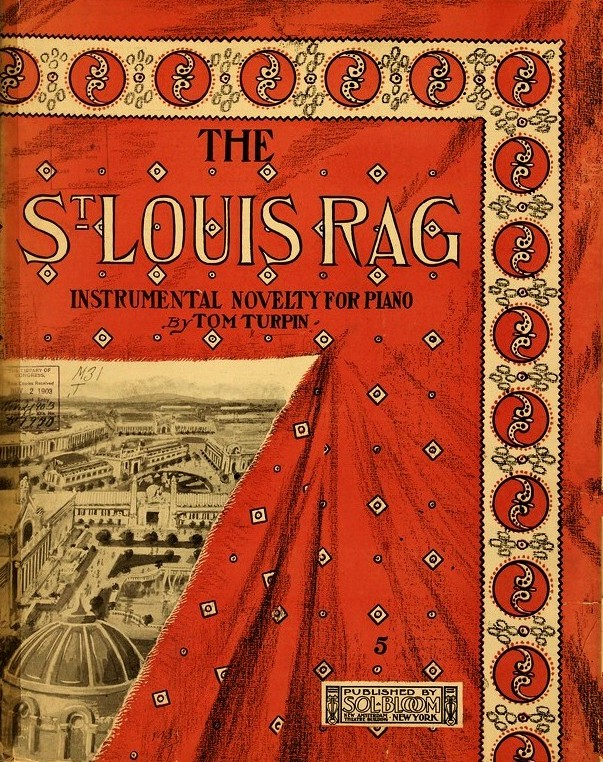
'St. Louis Rag' sheet music cover

- The St-Louis Rag

1904

- The Buffalo Rag

1909

- Siwash - Indian Intermezzo [Unpublished and Assumed Lost]

1914

- Pan-Am Rag [arranged by Arthur Marshall]

1917

- When Sambo Goes to France

== See also ==
- List of ragtime composers
