= Grace and Beauty =

Rag by James Scott

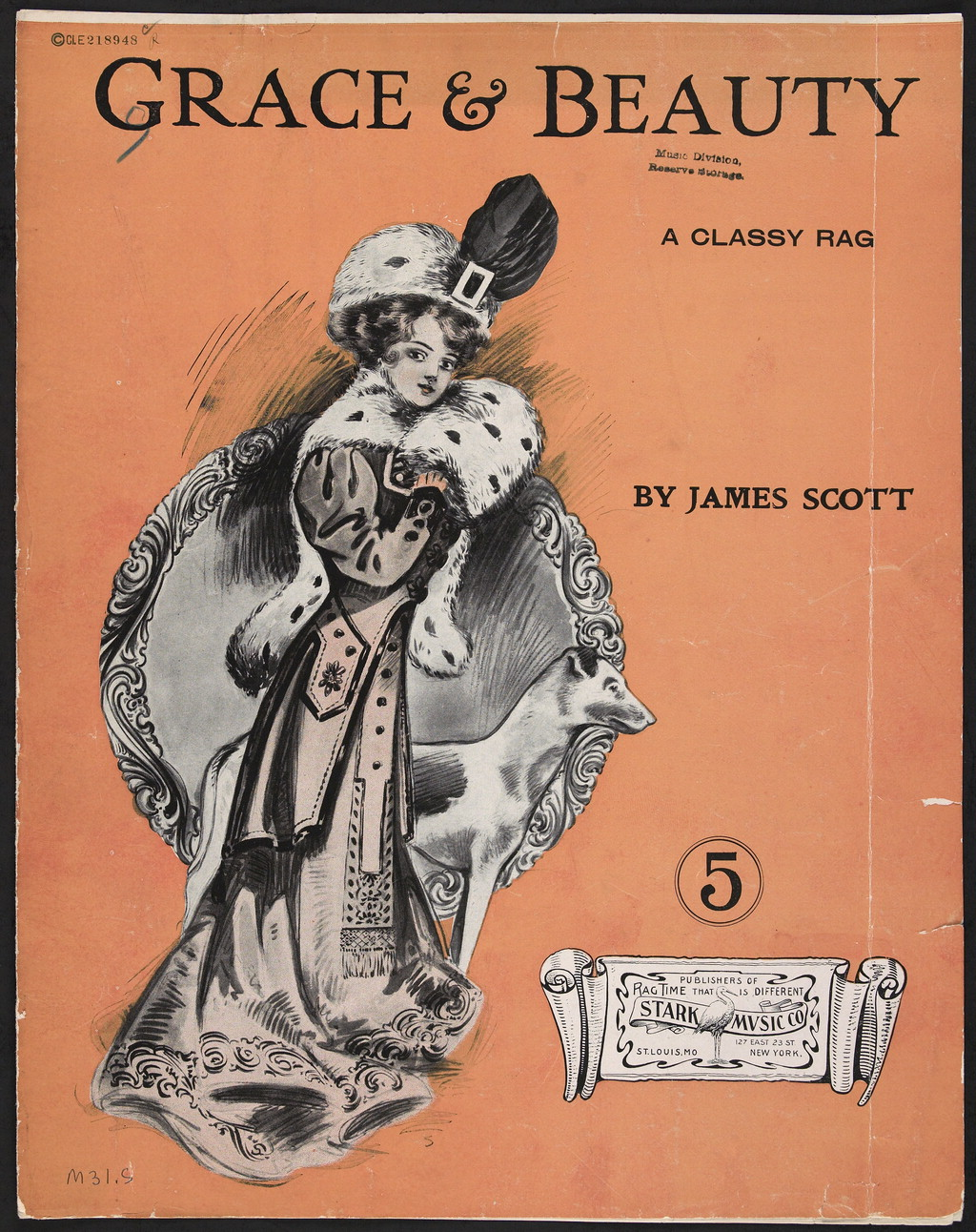
Cover page to the sheet music. Full sheet music available at Wikisource.

Grace and Beauty
A full-length synthesized performance of "Grace and Beauty".

"Grace and Beauty" is a classic rag composed by James Scott and published by John Stillwell Stark in 1909.

The A section starts out with a rising melody that slowly descends through repeated patterns. Like many of Scott's rags, the C and D sections contain the echo device reminiscent of the ring shout spirituals of the 19th century, while the B section uses a melodic variation of this device.
