= Frog Legs Rag =

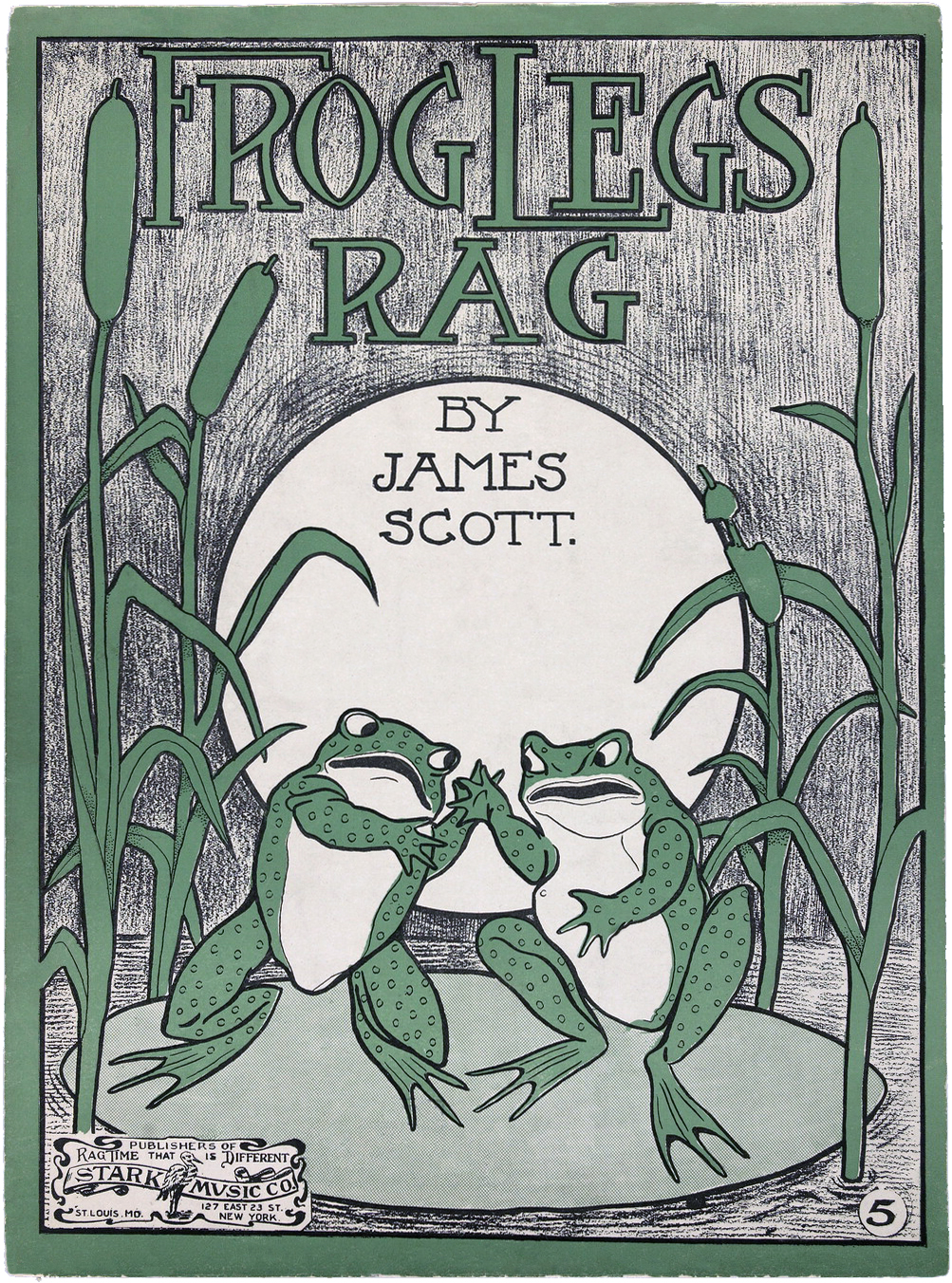
- Cover page to the sheet music. Full sheet music available at Wikisource.

Song by James Scott
- Language: English
- Written: 1906; 119 years ago
- Published: December 1906; 118 years ago
- Released: December 1906; 118 years ago
- Label: Stark Music Company
- Songwriter(s): James Scott
- A full-length synthesized performance of "Frog Legs Rag" by Adam Cuerden.

"Frog Legs Rag" is a classic rag composed by James Scott and published by John Stillwell Stark in December 1906. It was James Scott's first commercial success. Prior to this composition Scott had published marches. With "Frog Legs Rag", Scott embarked upon a career as a successful and important ragtime songwriter.

== Background ==
In 1909, Scott Joplin orchestrated "Frog Legs Rag" for publication by John Stillwell Stark, Joplin's publisher, and his company, Stark Music Company. Edward A. Berlin, author of the Joplin biography King of Ragtime: Scott Joplin and His Era asserts that there was no direct evidence that James Scott and Scott Joplin were personally acquainted. "They certainly knew each other's music," Berlin affirms while describing the Joplin orchestration, and they "had similar temperaments, both being mild-mannered, quiet, and thoroughly engrossed in their music". However, he considers assertions of personal acquaintance between the two men to be speculation.

Other music historians take a different view. The authors of Black Bottom Stomp credit Joplin for discovering and mentoring the young artist "even while his [Joplin's] own career was faltering" and assert that "Frog Legs Rag" was published "at Joplin's insistence".

== Structure ==
Ragtime encyclopedist David A. Jasen identifies a number of characteristic James Scott compositional devices in this early work.

The crisp freshness of the A section gives way to a sophisticated use in the B section of the "Maple Leaf Rag" B section. The lyrical C is an interesting development in feeling on the A section, with similar harmonics. The D section introduces us to one of Scott's favorite devices, the echo, or call and response phrasing in which an idea, usually of one measure, is stated and then repeated an octave higher. This develops the feel of B, once again with the use of similar chords. The modulation at the trio is unusual in that it goes to the dominant (A flat) instead of the subdominant, which would have put sections C and D in the key of G flat.

— David A. Jasen, Ragtime: An Encyclopedia, Discography, and Sheetography

Jasen's appraisal of "Frog Legs Rag" is not unreserved: he also places "Frog Legs Rag" within the early period when James Scott compositions were "flag-waving" and lacking in the restraint the songwriter developed after 1906. Unlike Joplin, who lengthened traditional ragtime phrasing, Scott explored the genre's dynamic qualities with shortened phrasings.

== Reception ==
Among songs published by Stark, "Frog Legs Rag" was second in sales after Joplin's "Maple Leaf Rag". "Frog Legs Rag" has been described as "brash" and "exuberant". It was also considered to be a landmark in ragtime sheet music, composed with "vigor" and "brilliance", and to be "one of the great hits of the ragtime years".
