= James Scott (composer) =

American ragtime composer and pianist (1885–1938)

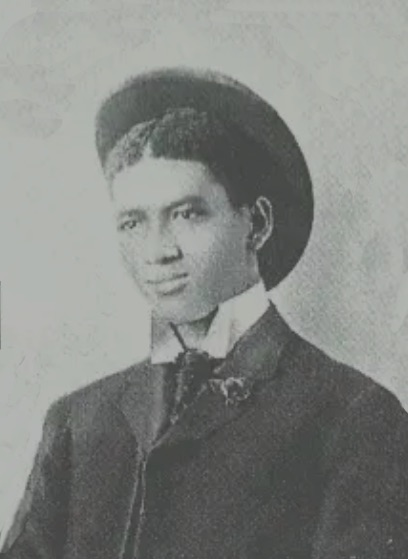
- Scott, c. 1904

Background information
- Also known as: The Little Professor
- Born: James Sylvester Scott; February 12, 1885; Neosho, Missouri, United States
- Died: August 30, 1938 (aged 53) Kansas City, Kansas, United States
- Genres: Ragtime; march; waltz
- Occupations: Composer, pianist, music teacher, band leader, arranger
- Instruments: Piano, organ
- Years active: 1901–1938

James Sylvester Scott (February 12, 1885 – August 30, 1938) was an American ragtime composer and pianist. He is regarded as one of the "Big Three" composers of classical ragtime along with Scott Joplin and Joseph Lamb.

== Early life and education ==
Scott was born in Neosho, Missouri, to James Scott Sr. and Molly Thomas Scott, both former slaves. In 1901, his family moved to Carthage, Missouri, where he attended Lincoln High School. He was given a piano after taking music lessons. In 1902, he began working at the music store of Charles L. Dumars, first washing windows, then demonstrating music at the piano as a song plugger, including his own pieces. Demand for his music convinced Dumars to print the first of Scott's published compositions, "A Summer Breeze - March and Two Step", in 1903. By 1904, two more compositions by Scott, "Fascinator March" and "On the Pike March" were published and sold well, but not enough to keep Dumars in business and soon the company ceased publishing.

== Career ==
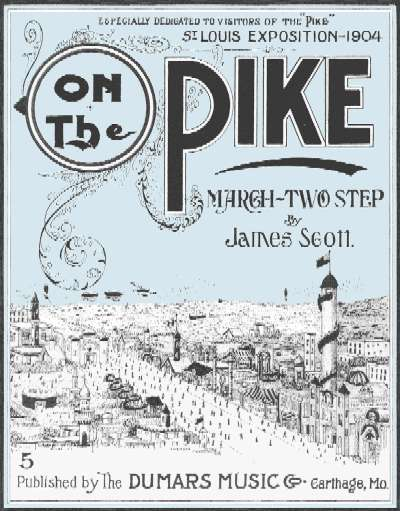
James Scott's 1904 "On the Pike", which refers to the midway of the St. Louis World's Fair of 1904.

Ragtime Historians Rudi Blesh and Harriet Janis recount that Scott went to St. Louis, Missouri, in search of his idol Scott Joplin in 1905. He located Joplin and asked if he would listen to one of his ragtime compositions. Upon hearing the rag, Joplin introduced him to his own publisher, John Stillwell Stark, and recommended he publish the work. Stark published the rag a year later as "Frog Legs Rag". It quickly became a hit and was second in sales in the Stark catalogue only to that of Joplin's own "Maple Leaf Rag". Scott became a regular contributor to the Stark catalogue until 1922.

In 1914, Scott moved to Kansas City, Missouri, where he married Nora Johnson, taught music, and accompanied silent movies as an organist and arranger at the Panama Theater. Those that knew him recall that theater work was a large part of his activity. His cousin Patsy Thomas remembers, "Everybody called him 'Little Professor' He always walked rapidly, looking at the ground - would pass you on the street and never see you - seemed always deep in thought."

In the last years of his life, Scott busied himself with teaching, composing and leading an eight-piece band that played for various beer parks and movie theaters in the area. With the arrival of sound movies, however, his fortunes declined. He lost his theater work, his wife died without child, and his health deteriorated. He moved in with his cousin Ruth Callahan in Kansas City, Kansas, and even though he was suffering from chronic dropsy, he continued to compose and play piano. He also worked as an accompanist for dances. Scott died at Douglas Hospital on August 30, 1938, at age 52 and was laid beside his wife in Westlawn Cemetery.

Scott's best-known compositions include "Climax Rag", '"Frog Legs Rag", "Grace and Beauty", "Ophelia Rag", and "The Ragtime Oriole".

Scott was a cousin of blues singer Ada Brown.

Frog Legs Rag
Scott's first hit, "Frog Legs Rag" (1906)

Grace and Beauty
"Grace and Beauty" (1909)

== In popular culture ==
In the third season of the HBO series Boardwalk Empire, Scott is portrayed by an uncredited actor in the episode "Spaghetti and Coffee".

== See also ==
- List of compositions by James Scott
- List of ragtime composers
