= List of ragtime musicians =

Musicians who are notable for their playing of ragtime music include (in alphabetical order):

- William Albright (1944–1998)
- John Arpin (1936–2007)
- Winifred Atwell (1914–1983)
- Mary Aufderheide (1888–1972)
- Irving Berlin (1901–1989)
- Mike Bernard (1881–1936)
- Blind Blake (1896–1934)
- Eubie Blake (1887–1983)
- William Bolcom (1938–)
- Euday L. Bowman (1887–1949)
- Lou Busch (1910–1979)
- Jo Ann Castle (1939–)
- Louis Chauvin (1881–1908)
- Zez Confrey (1895–1971)
- Ford Dabney (1883–1958)
- Scott Dettra (1975–)
- James Reese Europe (1880–1919)
- William Ezell (1892–1963)
- Blind Leroy Garnett (1897–1933)
- Gene Greene (1881–1930)
- Ben Harney (1872–1938)
- Ernest Hogan (1865–1909)
- Dick Hyman (1927–)
- Tony Jackson (1876–1921)
- Chas. Johnson (1876–1950)
- James P. Johnson (1894–1955)
- Scott Joplin (1867–1917)
- Sue Keller (1952–)
- Joseph Lamb (1887–1960)
- George Lewis (1900–1968)
- Johnny Maddox (1927–2018)
- Arthur Marshall (1881–1968)
- Artie Matthews (1888–1958)
- The New Rags
- Blind Willie McTell (1898–1959)
- Bob Milne
- John Mooney (1955–)
- Julia Lee Niebergall (1886–1968)
- Jelly Roll Morton (1890–1941)
- Vess Ossman (1868–1923)
- Harry Reser (1896–1965)
- David Thomas Roberts (1955–)
- Wally Rose (1913–1997)
- Joshua Rifkin (1944–)
- James Scott (1885–1938)
- Muggsy Spanier (1901–1967)
- Charley Straight (1891–1940)
- Wilbur Sweatman (1882–1961)
- Charlie Tagawa (1935–2017)
- Butch Thompson (1943–)
- Tom Turpin (1871–1922)
- Fred Van Eps (1913–1998)
- Dave Van Ronk (1936–2002)
- Terry Waldo (1944–)
- Fats Waller (1904–1943)
- Del Wood (1920–1989)
- Dick Zimmerman (1937–)
