= The Graduates (2008 film) =

2008 film by Ryan Gielen

- Directed by: Ryan Gielen
- Written by: Ryan Gielen
- Produced by: Ryan Gielen; Matthew Gielen; Joshua Davis; Caitlin Marshall
- Starring: Rob Bradford; Stephanie Lynn; Nick Vergara; Blake Merriman; Laurel Reese
- Cinematography: Mufit Umar
- Edited by: Ryan Gielen
- Production company: Believe Limited
- Release date: August 6, 2008 (Rhode Island International Film Festival)
- Running time: 97 minutes
- Country: United States
- Language: English
- Budget: $96,000

The Graduates is a 2008 American independent coming-of-age teen comedy film directed and written by Ryan Gielen. The film follows four friends—Ben (Rob Bradford), Andy (Blake Merriman), Mattie (Nick Vergara), and Nickie (Michael Pennacchio)—who head to Ocean City, Maryland to celebrate their high school graduation.

== Plot ==
18-year-old Ben, fresh out of high school in Maryland, is heading to Senior Week to hang out with friends, party, and chase the hottest girl in high school, Annie. While waiting outside a liquor store in Columbia for his older brother Josh, Ben is talking to himself when Brian, Josh's friend, overhears him, embarrassing Ben. Josh comes out of the store and hands Ben a bag of liquor. The two drive to pick up Ben's three friends, Andy, Mattie, and Nickie.

After picking up the trio, the group heads off to Ocean City. During the drive, the group has discussions about sex, which highlights the group's naïveté and their limited understanding of sex .

Upon arriving in Ocean City the group gets drunk and goes to a party. Josh attempts to instruct the younger guys on seducing women, telling them "the secret" about female body language. Annie, Ben's crush, enters the party, and her entrance completely distracts Ben. He sits down next to Annie and starts to flirt with her. As Ben and Annie begin to kiss, Nickie gets into a fight, which ends up causing Annie to leave and brings an early end to the party.

The next day, the group goes out on the town and cruises the boardwalk. They end up back at Ben's condo and play Asshole. Andy becomes president and declares that Nickie must toast him. After a brief verbal spat, Ben becomes Vice President and calls for a confession. After a descriptive story from Josh about losing his virginity, the boys stumble into an awkward conversation about divorce.

Throughout the ensuing week, the young men encounter a multitude of zany characters and situations.

== Cast ==
- Rob Bradford as Ben
- Blake Merriman as Andy
- Nick Vergara as Mattie
- Michael Pennacchio as Nickie
- Stephanie Lynn as Annie
- Josh Davis as Josh
- Max Lodge as Stuart
- Laurel Reese as Megs
- Brian Seibert as Brian
- Rachel Kiri Walker as Rachel
- Zak Williams as Mike "The Resonator" Resniski
- Josh Folan as Jesse Swomley
- Meghan Miller as Mellisa
- Lena Hall as Inga

== Production ==
The film is the feature-length directorial debut of Maryland native Ryan Gielen, who previously directed short films with his brother Matthew, a producer for the film.

It was shot on location in Ocean City, Maryland in September 2007.

The film is also the feature film debut of Zak Williams, son of actor Robin Williams.

=== Music ===
The film has three original composed songs by Seth Freeman. Indie rock band The New Rags also have three songs featured in the film.

== Release ==
The film premiered at the Rhode Island International Film Festival on August 6, 2008. The filmmakers used grassroots campaigning to promote the film and held screenings along the East coast. The film was also shown at the Myrtle Beach International Film Festival on December 2, 2008.

== Awards and honors ==
At the Rhode Island Film Festival, the film was given the Directorial Discovery Award.
