= The Jazz Discography =

Online discography

- Editor-in-chief: Tom Lord
- Categories: Jazz music
- Publisher: Lord Music Reference Inc.
- Founder: Tom Lord
- Country: Canada
- Based in: Chilliwack, British Columbia
- Language: English
- Website: www.lordisco.com
- ISSN: 1700-439X
- OCLC: 48027258

The Jazz Discography is a print, CD-ROM, and online discography and sessionography of all categories of recorded jazz — and directly relevant precursors of recorded jazz from 1896. The publisher, Lord Music Reference Inc., a British Columbia company, is headed by Tom Lord and is based in Chilliwack, British Columbia, Canada. The initial 26 of 35 print volumes, which comprise the discography, were issued from 1992 to 2001 in alphabetic order. In 2002, The Jazz Discography became the first comprehensive jazz discography on CD-ROM.

== Scope ==
The Jazz Discography covers all categories of jazz and other creative improvised music, including traditional, swing, bebop, modern, avant-garde, fusion, third stream, and others. As of January 2008, the database contained 34,861 leaders, 181,392 recording sessions, 1,030,109 musician entries, and 1,077,503 tune entries.

=== Early listings ===
There is an ongoing debate over when and where the word "jazz" became a common, commercial reference for the jazz genre, a genre that predates the word. Bert Kelly (1882–1968), a banjoist and jazz club owner from Chicago, is known for having used the word "jass," on his Chicago venue marquee in 1914. To resolve such vagaries, TJD Online allows users to search by year, beginning 1896. The two listings of 1896 are the compositions of Scott Joplin, preserved on piano rolls — not performed by Joplin — but subsequently recorded many times.

There is a prevailing consensus that the first commercially released jazz recording was the "Livery Stable Blues" (third take), recorded on February 26, 1917, by the Original Dixieland Jass Band of New Orleans.

=== Sources ===
Numerous data sources comprise the database. They include existing general and individual jazz discographies and international jazz periodicals. With initial mixed sentiment over some sources, reviewers observed that Lord borrowed heavily from, but expanded upon, the major comprehensive jazz discography work of Walter Bruyninckx, whose research was, and still is (as of 2013), ongoing. Sentiment grew mostly positive after the 26th printed volume was published. Additional input has, and still is being received from recording companies and their catalogs and the issues of Cadence magazine covering many recordings not listed in other discographies. Individuals — particularly record collectors, musicologists, and jazz historians — have, and continue to provide data.

=== Discography format and categories ===
The project is organized alphabetically by bandleader, and within each individual entry, chronologically by recording session. For each session, it identifies track and album titles, personnel and instrumentation, location and date, and recording label and numbers. Indexes are organized alphabetically by musician and by tune title. The discography includes recording dates but excludes release dates.

=== Limited data for cassette releases ===
Some commercially available cassette releases have been included in The Jazz Discography, but the publisher makes no claim to completeness.

== Publication sets ==
The Jazz Discography (print)

Volume 1: A – Bankhead
(1992) ISBN 1-881993-00-0 OCLC 723506346
Volume 2: Billy Banks – Christer Boustedt
(1992) ISBN 1-881993-01-9 OCLC 723506344
Volume 3: Boutte – Cathcart
(1992) ISBN 1-881993-02-7 OCLC 723506342
Volume 4: Catherine – Dagradi
(1992) ISBN 1-881993-03-5 OCLC 723506338
Volume 5: Dahlander – Dutch Dixie Devils
(1993) ISBN 1-881993-04-3 OCLC 723506335
Volume 6: Dutch Swing College Band – Fischbacher
(1993) ISBN 1-881993-05-1 OCLC 723506332
Volume 7: Clare Fischer – János Gonda
(1994) ISBN 1-881993-06-X OCLC 723506327
Volume 8: Nat Gonella – Everette Harp
(1994) ISBN 1-881993-07-8 OCLC 723506325
Volume 9: Billy Harper to Claude Hopkins
(1994) ISBN 1-881993-08-6 OCLC 769972678
Volume 10: Duncan Hopkins – Doug Jernigan
(1994) ISBN 1-881993-09-4 OCLC 769972680
Volume 11: Jeff Jerolamon – Billy Kirsch
(1995) ISBN 1-881993-10-8 OCLC 770790833
Volume 12: Kiruna Swingsextett – Mark Lewis
(1995) ISBN 1-881993-11-6 OCLC 770790838
Volume 13: Meade Lux Lewis – Steve Masakowski
(1995) ISBN 1-881993-12-4 OCLC 770793302
Volume 14: Miya Masaoka – Sid Millward
(1996) ISBN 1-881993-13-2 OCLC 770790935
Volume 15: Bob Milne – Martha Nelson
(1996) ISBN 1-881993-14-0 OCLC 770793777
Volume 16: Oliver Nelson – Paradise City Jazz Band
(1997) ISBN 1-881993-15-9 OCLC 770793757
Volume 17: Paradise Club Band – Roy Powell
(1997) ISBN 1-881993-16-7 OCLC 770790931
Volume 18: Seldon Powell – Rimaak
(1997) ISBN 1-881993-17-5 OCLC 772017440
Volume 19: Sammy Rimington – Janne Schaffer
(1997) ISBN 1-881993-18-3 OCLC 772017478
Volume 20: Wolfgang Schalk – Holly Slater
(1998) ISBN 1-881993-19-1 OCLC 772322812
Volume 21: John Slaughter – Straight Line Jazz Ensemble
(1999) ISBN 1-881993-20-5 OCLC 772473461
Volume 22: Straight Talk – Ole Thomsen
(1999) ISBN 1-881993-21-3 OCLC 772681616
Volume 23: Dawn Thomson – Roy Vaughan
(2000) ISBN 1-881993-22-1 OCLC 772908793
Volume 24: Sarah Vaughan – Barry Wedgle
(2000) ISBN 1-881993-23-X OCLC 773031438
Volume 25: Wee Big Band – Titi Winterstein
(2000) ISBN 1-881993-24-8 OCLC 773197201
Volume 26: Jens Winther – Zzebra
(2001) ISBN 1-881993-25-6 OCLC 163345247
Volume 27; Musician Index, Part 1: A – Erich Kunzel
(2002) ISBN 1-881993-26-4 OCLC 163317594
Volume 28; Musician Index, Part 2: Fritz Kunzel – Doc Zywan
(2002) ISBN 1-881993-27-2 OCLC 163317634
Volume 29; Tune Index, Part 1: 0 (zero) – "The Happy Ones"
(2002) ISBN 1-881993-28-0 OCLC 174711185, 163238553
Volume 30; Tune Index, Part 2: "The Happy Organ" – "Pentatitus"
(2002) ISBN 1-881993-29-9 OCLC 163238603, 174711205
Volume 31; Tune Index, Part 3: "Pentatonia" – "ZZ's Blues"
(2002) ISBN 1-881993-30-2 OCLC 163238612
Volume 32; Addendum Vol. 1: A – Lucien Barbarin
(2003) ISBN 1-881993-31-0 OCLC 163147004, 314179184
Volume 33; Addendum Vol. 2:
(2002) ISBN 1-881993-32-9 OCLC 163523463, 314453083
Volume 34; Addendum Vol. 3: Jean-Paul Bourelly – Bob Casanova
(2002) ISBN 1-881993-33-7 OCLC 163523664, 315094679

The Jazz Discography (CD-ROM)
Version 3.3 (same data as Vols. 1–26)
(2002) OCLC 50259659, 640537268
Version 4.4
(2005)
Version 5.0: 1992–2004
(2004) OCLC 57377680, 57518752
Version 6.0: 1992–2005
(2005) OCLC 475546570, 62894197
Version 7.0: 1992–2006
(2007)
Version 8.0: 1992–2007
(2008)
Version 9.0: 1992–2008
(2009)
Version 10.0: 1992–2009
(2010)
Version 11.0: 1992–2010
(2011)
Version 12.0: 1992–2011
(2012)
Version 13.0: 1992–2012
(2013)
Version 14.0: 1992–2013
(2014)
Version 15.0: 1992–2014
(2015)
Version 16.0: 1992–2015
(2016)
Version 17.0: 1992–2016
(2017)
Version 18.0: 1992–2017
(2018)
Version 19.0: 1992–2018
(2019)
Version 20.0: 1992–2019
(2020)

Version 21.0: 1992-2020 (2021)

The Jazz Discography (online)
TJD Online
(launched 2005) OCLC 182585494, 690104143

== About Tom Lord ==
Before embarking on The Jazz Discography, Tom Lord had been a mechanical engineer and, later, an executive at a shipping container company. Lord, together with Bob Rusch, founded Cadence Jazz Records in 1980, an offshoot of Cadence magazine. Lord financed the record label launch and was a silent partner. In the 1990s, Lord also indexed back issues of Cadence.
