= Salena Jones =

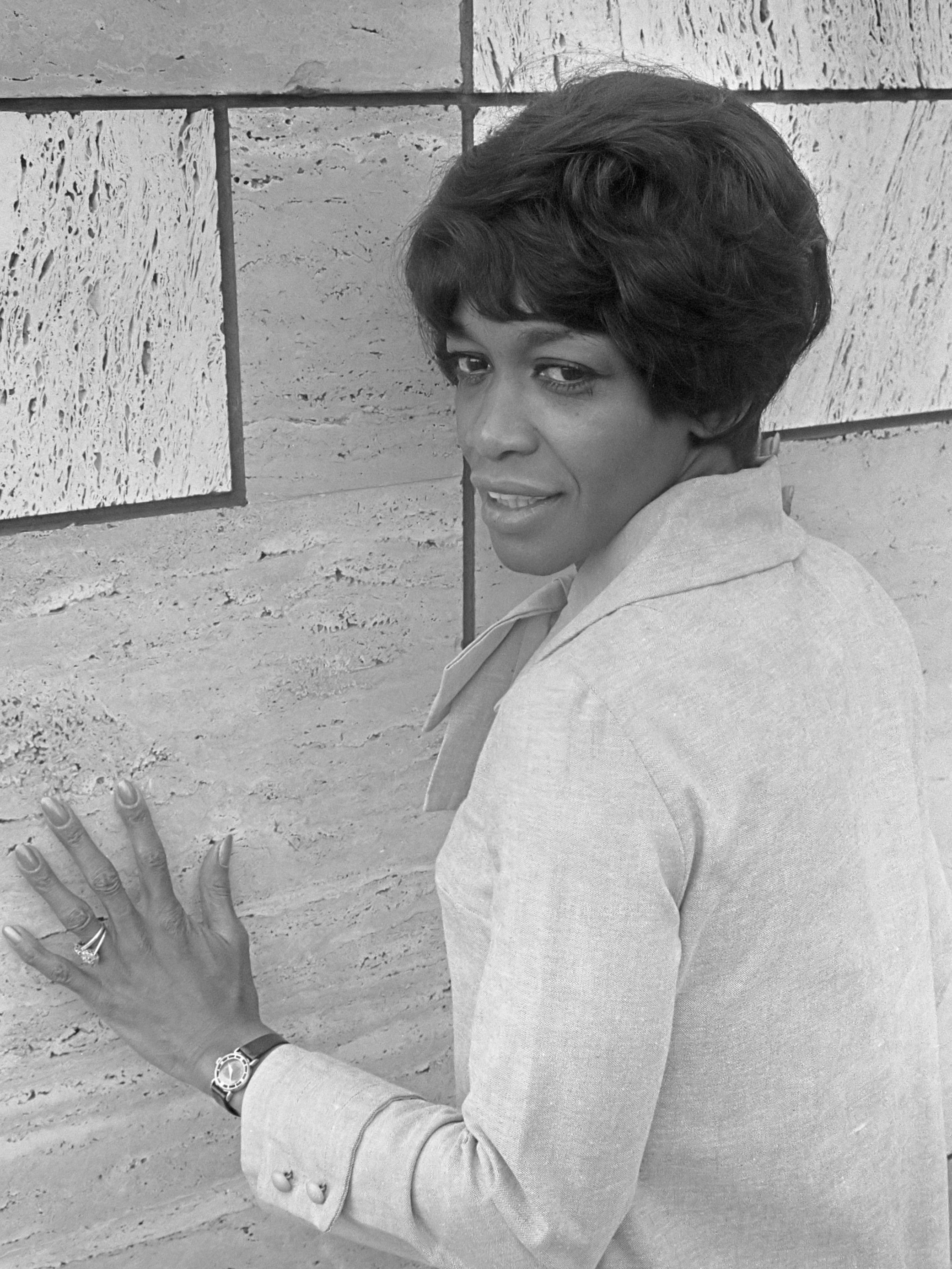
- Salena Jones (1970)

Background information
- Also known as: Joan Shaw
- Born: Joan Elizabeth Shaw; January 29, 1938 (age 88); Newport News, Virginia, United States
- Genres: Jazz, cabaret, R&B
- Occupation: Vocalist
- Years active: 1949–present
- Labels: Savoy, MGM, Regal, Abbey, Coral, Gem, Jaguar, ABC-Paramount, Sue, CBS, JVC Victor
- Website: SalenaJones.com

Salena Jones (born Joan Elizabeth Shaw, January 29, 1938) (Note: Several reliable sources, including 60 Years of Recorded Jazz, 1917–1967 by Walter Bruyninckx, and The Encyclopedia Yearbooks of Jazz by Leonard Feather, give January 29, 1930 as the date of birth of the singer Joan Shaw. The liner notes for her 1961 LP Joan Shaw Sings For Swingers, also written by Feather, state that she "...began singing in amateur programs around town from the time she was 13. Within a couple of years she had graduated to local night clubs, and soon she had her first fling in New York, trying out in the amateur hour at the Apollo Theater. Soon after, in 1948, she was hired as band vocalist with a group led by Paul Williams....". It is clear and uncontested that Joan Shaw later began using the name Salena Jones, after moving to England. However, the sources for Joan Shaw conflict with other sources such as AllMusic, and The Rough Guide to Jazz, which give Salena Jones' date of birth as January 29, 1944.) is an American jazz and cabaret singer. After performing and recording in the US as Joan Shaw from the late 1940s until the early 1960s, in various styles including jazz and R&B, she moved to England and from then on performed as Salena Jones. She has toured internationally and recorded over forty albums.

== Biography ==
=== Early life and career ===
According to most sources, she was born Joan Elizabeth Shaw in Newport News, Virginia, though some sources give the name Joan DeCarlo. Her uncle was a vaudeville comedian, dancer and singer, Bootsie Swan. After first singing in her church and school, she started performing in clubs by the age of fifteen. She won a talent contest in New York's Apollo Theater, singing "September Song", and after making demonstration records for Peggy Lee and Lena Horne, acquired her own contract as Joan Shaw. Her first disc was 1949's "He Knows How to Hucklebuck", with the Paul "Hucklebuck" Williams Orchestra, for the Savoy label. On October 9, 1949, Joan Shaw, accompanied by The Rubin Mitchell Trio, headlined the Rockland Palace, in Harlem, New York.

In the early 1950s, she recorded for various labels including MGM (1950), Regal, Abbey (both 1951), and Coral (1952), often working with vocal group The Five Keys and the Billy Ford Orchestra. After some time performing in clubs in Florida and elsewhere as a nightclub singer, she began touring with an R&B band, the Blues Express, appearing with Johnnie Ray, Arthur Prysock, Varetta Dillard, Peppermint Harris, and others. She recorded in various styles, including R&B on recordings such as "You Drive Me Crazy" on the Gem label in 1953.

In 1954, she had a club residency in Bermuda, where she performed with saxophonist "King" Curtis Ousley, before returning to New York and recording for the Jaguar label. She continued to tour, and sang on bills with Louis Armstrong, Cab Calloway, Duke Ellington, Big Maybelle, LaVern Baker and others. She recorded later in the decade for ABC-Paramount and the small U-C label, but mainstream success eluded her and she was bypassed by the growth of rock and roll. In 1960, she began recording for Epic Records, releasing several singles and, in 1961, the LP Joan Shaw Sings For Swingers, recorded with the Bellino Ramaglia Orchestra and with liner notes by Leonard Feather. Her second LP, Joan Shaw In Person, was released by Sue Records in 1963.

=== As Salena Jones ===
Faced with diminishing success and racism in the US, Joan Shaw reinvented herself in the mid-1960s as Salena Jones. She said, "I loved Sarah Vaughan so much and adored Lena Horne's elegance; I put them together as 'Salena.' It looked good. And I kept Joan in 'Jones.'" And that's how Salena Jones was born."

Jones toured in Spain (1965) and Britain (1966), where she appeared for an extended season at Ronnie Scott's Jazz Club. In 1969 she filmed a scene where she sings in a nightclub for the British film Tam Lin, directed by Roddy McDowell and starring Ava Gardner, which was released in 1970.

Since the late 1960s Jones has appeared at most leading concert halls and clubs in Europe, Africa, South America and Asia, and appeared regularly on radio and TV, with her own series in the United Kingdom. Since visiting Japan for the first time (1978) she appeared there annually, memorably in the Unesco Save The Children Telethon (1988), and on a concert tour with the Royal Philharmonic Orchestra (1992). In 1964, Down Beat jazz critic Leonard Feather chose Salena Jones as one of the female vocalists of the year, alongside Peggy Lee, Ella Fitzgerald (also from Newport News) and Nancy Wilson.

Jones has also appeared throughout Britain, touring with the Million Airs Orchestra, France, Germany, Switzerland, Spain, the Netherlands, Italy, Denmark, Sweden, Belgium, Turkey, Austria and Bulgaria. She has also made numerous television and radio broadcasts in Britain, and throughout Europe, often supported by the BBC Big Band. Also performed in Australia, Africa, South America, China, Canada, Hong Kong, Indonesia, Thailand and Japan. Since her first visit to Japan in 1978 she has returned at least annually, appearing in concert halls, on television, radio and regularly at the Blue Note Jazz Clubs in Tokyo, Osaka and Fukuoka.

In her career to date Jones has recorded over forty albums, covering nearly five hundred songs, and sold over 500,000 albums worldwide and her album entitled My Love recorded in Tokyo won her an award in Japan for outstanding sales. Jones's musical biography includes many distinguished musicians, band leaders and other artists with whom she has performed or recorded. These include such performers as her long-time producer and husband Keith Mansfield, Herman Foster, Tom Jones, The Coasters, Count Basie Orchestra, Adelaide Hall, Art Farmer, Brook Benton, Barney Kessel, Art Themen, Sarah Vaughan, Hank Jones, Maynard Ferguson, and Dudley Moore.

In Rio de Janeiro not long before Antonio Carlos Jobim's death she recorded Salena Sings Jobim With The Jobims (1994) (licensed from Japanese Victor by Vine Gate Music UK), Jobim's hits sung in English, with Paulo Jobim on vocals, flute and guitar, grandson Daniel Cannetti Jobim on piano and the composer himself on two duets, Kenny Burrell on one track: 14 Jobim songs plus Michael Franks's tributes "Antonio's Song (The Rain- bow)" and "Abandoned Garden", and including two duos with Antonio Carlos "Tom" Jobim himself. In the 1990s, Jones made a sequence of six albums all consisting of standards and completed in six weeks, including mixing. Some of these albums, including Dream with Salena, Journey with Salena, Broadway and Hollywood are themed with songs appropriate to the titles.

Early 2000 saw Jones starring at the Lionel Hampton Jazz Festival in Idaho, backed by the Hank Jones Quartet including such as Russell Malone, Lewis Nash, and also featuring trumpeter Roy Hargrove, singer Dianne Reeves and Freddie Cole. January 2001 saw Jones return to Israel for eight sell-out shows, and she took her trio to Japan in May for two weeks appearing for Cartier, the jewellers, at their trade fairs throughout the country. In May 2006, Jones sang again in China opening the Shanghai International Jazz Festival (opened in 2005 by Diana Krall). Jones opened with Lee Ritenour, and Tower of Power.

She is now based in Ascot, Berkshire, England.

In Monty Python's The Meaning of Life, two American tourists discuss whether Jones's lyrics were written by Schopenhauer. This is because they are aware she sings about the meaning of life.

== Discography ==
=== Albums ===
==== Joan Shaw ====
Year	Title	Label
1961	Joan Shaw Sings For Swingers	Epic
1963	Joan Shaw In Person	Sue

==== Salena Jones ====
Year	Title	Label
1969	The Moment of Truth	CBS
1970	Everybody's Talkin' About Salena Jones	CBS
1971	Platinum	CBS
1973	Alone and Together	RCA
1974	This 'n' That	RCA
1976	Where Peaceful Waters Flow	DJM
1978	Stairway to the Stars	Eastworld
1979	Stormy With Luv	JVC
1980	Ballad With Luv	JVC
1980	Love Is In The Air	JVC
1980	Melodies of Love	JVC
1981	My Love	JVC
1982	Salena Fascinates	JVC
1983	Shifting Sands of Time	JVC
1984	Feelings Change	JVC
1986	I Want To Know About You	JVC
1987	The Song of Life	JVC
1988	Let It Be	JVC
1991	Night Mood	JVC
1992	I Love Paris	JVC
1994	Salena Sings Jobim with the Jobims	Vine Gate
1994	Only Love	JVC Victor
1994	In Hollywood	JVC Victor
1994	Journey With Salena Jones	JVC Victor
1995	It Amazes Me	Vine Gate
1995	Dream With Salena Jones	JVC Victor
1995	By Request	JVC Victor
1996	Singin' In The Rain	JVC Victor
1996	By Request Vol. II	JVC Victor
1996	Love With Salena Jones	JVC Victor
1997	Night Mood	JVC Victor
1998	Salena Jones Meets Kenny Burrell	JVC Victor
1999	You Never Done It Like That	JVC Victor
1999	Classic Salena	JVC Victor
2001	Those Eyes	JVC Victor
2002	Salena Swings	JVC Victor
2003	Let's Fall in Love	JVC
2008	Love & Inspiration	Victor
2010	Salena Sings J-Ballads	Pony Canyon
2011	Have You Met Miss Jones? (My Life And Music)	Vine Gate
