= Grace McLean =

American singer-songwriter

- Born: January 11, 1984 (age 42); Costa Mesa, California
- Education: NYU Tisch School of the Arts (BFA)
- Occupations: Actress, playwright, composer, singer, songwriter, orchestrator, educator
- Spouse: Christopher Ryan Grant (m. 2018)
- Relatives: Mike McLean (brother)
- Musical career
- Genres: Pop; rock; Jazz; Electronica; Swing; Musical theatre
- Instruments: Vocals, piano, ukulele, pump organ, loops
- Label: Self-released
- Website: gracemclean.com

Grace McLean is an American actress, playwright, composer and singer. She is known for her roles in various Broadway and off-Broadway productions such as Natasha, Pierre & The Great Comet of 1812, Bad Cinderella, Suffs, Bedbugs, Alice by Heart, and In The Green, the latter of which she wrote. She is also known for her work as a music educator and for fronting the band Grace McLean and Them Apples. Her debut full-length album My Lovely Enemy was released on May 10, 2024.

== Early life ==
McLean graduated from the Orange County School of the Arts in Santa Ana, California in 2002.

== Career ==
=== Theatre ===
In 2013, McLean starred as Marya Dmitriyevna in the original Off-Broadway production in Dave Malloy's EDM-rock opera Natasha, Pierre & The Great Comet of 1812. She later reprised this role in the 2015 American Repertory Theatre and 2016 Broadway productions, as well as on both of the show's official cast recordings.

In 2017, McLean was named one of Lincoln Center's writers-in-residence, allowing her free rein of office space and materials to create original theatre works. Them Apples had previously performed in both the 2015 and 2016 Lincoln Center American Songbook series.

In 2019 McLean starred in the new Off-Broadway musical Alice by Heart based on Alice's Adventures in Wonderland as The Queen of Hearts, Red Cross Nurse, and Magpie.

Also in 2019, McLean wrote the book, music, lyrics, and orchestrations for In the Green, a new musical about the life of eleventh century abbess, christian mystic, composer, and polymath Hildegard von Bingen. McLean also plays Jutta von Sponheim, Hildegard's mentor and fellow prisoner. The show opened on June 4 Off-Broadway at Lincoln Center's LCT3 Theatre and closed on August 14, 2019. The show was nominated for 6 awards at the 2020 Lucille Lortel Award including Outstanding Musical, and McLean winning for Outstanding Lead Actress in a Musical. The original cast recording was released on October 16, 2020, through Ghostlight Records.

On December 8, 2022, it was announced that McLean would be originating the role of The Queen in Andrew Lloyd Webber's Bad Cinderella on Broadway. She played the role until the show's closing on June 4, 2023.

McLean originated the role of Woodrow Wilson in the Off-Broadway production of Suffs in 2022, and reprised the role in the 2024 Broadway production.

=== Music ===
McLean's voice has been described as "a flexible instrument with unexpected reserves of power". She is also noted for her use of loops, creating layers of sound, turning her solo voice into a full rhythm section. Her band, Grace McLean & Them Apples (featuring Hiroyuki Matsuura, and Justin Goldner) incorporates a myriad of styles including swing, hip-hop, electronica, jazz, and musical theatre In 2015 and 2016 the band toured Russia and Pakistan as ambassadors for the U.S. State Department.

The band released two EPs, Make Me Breakfast in 2012 and Natural Disaster in 2016. McLean's debut full-length album My Lovely Enemy was released on May 10, 2024, by Meridian/ECR Music Group and produced by Justin Goldner, following several advance singles: the first single, "Reckless", was released on May 23, 2023. Another single, "Albertine", was described by TunesAround as "Intimate and haunting…a mesmerizing and thought-provoking single…[w]ith…rich composition and evocative lyrics”.

She also voiced Madame Sunshine in the musical podcast The Fall of the House of Sunshine.

== Theatre credits ==
Year	Title	Role	Notes
2007	Help Yourself	Lucille/Tiffany/Ravanna Melon	Williamstown Theatre Festival
2007	The Prophet Muhammad: A Musical	Khadija/Merchant/Kid	Williamstown Theatre Festival
2008	Twelve Ophelias	R	McCarren Park
2010	The Last Goodbye	Apothecary/Servant/Samson	Williamstown Theatre Festival
2011	Sleep No More	Caroline Reville/Madeline	Off-Broadway
2013	Natasha, Pierre & The Great Comet of 1812	Marya Dmitryevna Ackrosimova	Off-Broadway
2014	Bedbugs	Carly	Off-Broadway
2014	The World Is Round		Off-Broadway
2015	Brooklynite	Blue Nixie	Vineyard Theatre
2015	Pump Boys and Dinettes	Prudie Cupp	Weston Playhouse
2016-2017	Natasha, Pierre & The Great Comet of 1812	Marya Dmitryevna Ackrosimova	Broadway
2019	Alice by Heart	Red Queen/Red Cross Nurse/Magpie	Off-Broadway
2019	In The Green	Jutta	Off-Broadway
2019	Cyrano	Chaperone Marie	Off-Broadway
2021	Row	Tori	Williamstown Theatre Festival
2022	Suffs	Woodrow Wilson	Off-Broadway
2023	Bad Cinderella	The Queen	Broadway
2024	Suffs	Woodrow Wilson	Broadway
2025	Penelope	Penelope	Ancram Center for the Arts; Joe's Pub
2026	Penelope	Penelope	Edinburgh Festival Fringe
2026	Cold War Choir Practice	Choir	

== Music releases ==
Year	Title	Notes
2012	Make Me Breakfast	EP
2015	Natural Disaster	EP
2023	Reckless	single
2023	My Lovely Enemy	single
2024	Albertine	single
2024	My Lovely Enemy	album
