= Rubin Mitchell =

American jazz pianist and composer (1927–1972)

Rubin Morris Mitchell (July 11, 1927 – December 21, 1972) was an American jazz pianist, composer, and leader of his eponymous jazz trio from 1949 through the rest of his life. According to his WWII draft card, he also went by Myles for his middle name.

== Early musical career ==
On October 9, 1949, The Rueben Mitchell Trio accompanied Joan Shaw who was 11 years old at the time and known as "The Hucklebuck Girl", headlining the Rockland Palace, in Miami, Florida.

In August 1951 Mitchell was signed to Columbia Records by J.J. Johnston, however before he could release any music, he was conscripted for the Korean War. He served in Korea from 1952 to 1954. Two early records were released under his birth-name in 1951 and 1953 "After Hours In Haiti" and "Mambo After Hours", both on OKeh Records. In 1957, Reuben Mitchell performed (as a trio which included Chris Rouse and Dave Aikens) for twenty-eight weeks at the Flamingo Hotel; during this time he accompanied piano for Judy Garland on December 27, 1957. At the Flamingo Club in Las Vegas, he shared bandstands with such top music personalities as Count Basie and Harry James. He has also accompanied Jack Benny and Ray Bolger on the piano. Between 1960 and 1962 he had an 18-month residency at The Flamingo in Las Vegas.

== Starmaker Records ==
The earliest known releases by Rubin Mitchell was on Starmaker Records, a Jazz Label from New York City. First releasing two 7" singles ("Li'l Liza Jane" and "Dardanella") followed by a full-length album ("The Golden Hands Of Rubin Mitchell"). All three releases were recorded at Plaza Sound Studios, most famous for being the rehearsal space for Arturo Toscanini and his symphony orchestra in the 1930s. The Rubin Mitchell Trio had an established a seasonal residency, six nights a week, at The Georgian Hotel in Lake George, New York. The residency at The Georgian lasted for three years.

== Albums ==
Album	Album Details
The Golden Hands Of Reuben Mitchell	Released: pre-May 1965; Label: Starmaker Records; Formats: Vinyl
Alright, Okay, You Win!	Released: April 1966; Label: Capitol Records; Formats: Vinyl
Presenting Rubin Mitchell	Released: February 13, 1967; Label: Capitol Records; Formats: Vinyl
The Remarkable Rubin	Released: 1968; Label: Capitol Records; Formats: Vinyl

== Singles ==
Single	Single Details
After Hours In Haiti / Out Of Nowhere	Released: 1951; Label: OKeh Records; Formats: 10" Shellac
Mambo After Hours / Tropical Blues	Released: 1953; Label: OKeh Records; Formats: 10" Shellac
Li'l Liza Jane / Hallelujah I Love Her So	Released: Pre-May 1965; Label: Starmaker Records; Formats: 7"
Dardenella / You're nobody til' somebody loves you	Released: Pre-May 1965; Label: Starmaker Records; Formats: 7"
Alright, Okay, You Win / Don't Forget 127th Street	Released: April 1966; Label: Capitol Records; Formats: 7"
My Liza Jane / Spanish Eyes	Released: April 1966; Label: Capitol Records; Formats: "7
The Fox / Fiddler On The Roof - Matchmaker	Released: 1968; Label: Capitol Records; Formats: 7"
Loosen Up / Summer Dreams	Released: 1968; Label: Capitol Records; Formats: Vinyl

== Death ==
He died in Miami, Florida on December 21, 1972. His wife, Louise, later petitioned for the Army to assist with a gravemarker.
