= Nature Cat =

Animated children's television series

- Title card
- Genre: Children's television series Animated sitcom Adventure; Comedy; Musical; Preschool
- Created by: Adam Rudman; David Rudman; Todd Hannert
- Voices of: Taran Killam; Bobby Moynihan; Kate Micucci; Kate McKinnon; Kenan Thompson; Chris Knowings
- Theme music composer: Bill Sherman
- Opening theme: "Nature Cat Theme Song", performed by Taran Killam, Christopher Jackson, and Veronica Jackson
- Ending theme: "Nature Cat Theme" (instrumental)
- Composers: Stuart Kollmorgen; Doug Califano
- Countries of origin: United States; Canada
- Original language: English
- No. of seasons: 5
- No. of episodes: 98 (186 segments + 5 specials) (list of episodes)

Production
- Executive producers: Adam Rudman; David Rudman; Vince Commisso (seasons 1–3); Steven Jarosz (seasons 1–3); Blake Tohana (seasons 2–3); Heather Walker (seasons 4–5)
- Producers: Caroline Bandolik; Frances Nankin; Jesse McMahon; Scott Scornavacco
- Running time: 28 minutes (12 minutes per segment)
- Production companies: Spiffy Pictures; WTTW Chicago; 9 Story Media Group (seasons 1–3); Yowza! Animation (seasons 4–5)

Original release
- Network: PBS Kids
- Release: November 25, 2015 – January 2, 2024

Nature Cat is an educational animated children's television series that aired from November 25, 2015, to January 2, 2024, on PBS Kids and is aimed at preschoolers and early elementary children aged 3 to 8. The series follows the adventures of four main characters, Nature Cat, Hal the Dog, Daisy the Bunny, and Squeeks the Mouse. The show has been nominated for a Daytime Emmy Award for "Outstanding Writing in an Animated Program". The series debut in November achieved nearly 3.7 million viewers, and by March it has achieved 69 million video streams across online platforms.

In October 2016, Nature Cat was renewed for a second and third season. The second season premiered on January 1, 2018, while the third premiered on April 18, 2019. In 2021, the show was renewed for a fourth and fifth season. The fourth premiered on May 9, 2022, and the fifth and final season premiered on April 17, 2023. The series has aired five standalone specials, with the newest releasing on April 3, 2025.

On June 5, 2018, the first DVD Onward and Pondward was released. Tomy owns the toy license to Nature Cat, and has released several stuffed animals of the main characters.

Reruns of Nature Cat aired on the PBS Kids block on PBS until July 4, 2025. The show still airs on the PBS Kids 24/7 channel.

== Overview ==
Set in the suburbs of Chicago, the series follows Fred, a yellow cat with dreams of exploring nature, but being a house cat, no instincts for the outside world.. Once his family leaves for the day, he transforms into his alter-ego Nature Cat and sets off on backyard outdoor adventures with his animal friends. Through the learning experiences of the characters, this series intends to encourage children to similarly engage with and develop understanding of nature.

== Episodes ==
Season	Segments	Episodes	Originally released	
Season	Segments	Episodes	First released	Last released
1	76	38 (Note: Although Season 1 technically has 40 episodes, two episodes are omitted from this total count, as they are "Part 1" and "Part 2" of the one-hour "Ocean Commotion" special.)	November 25, 2015	September 15, 2017
Specials	—N/a	5	June 19, 2017	April 3, 2025
2	40	20	January 1, 2018	April 17, 2019
3	30	15	April 18, 2019	June 4, 2021
4	20	10	May 9, 2022	September 23, 2022
5	20	10	April 17, 2023	January 2, 2024

== Characters ==
=== Main ===
- Nature Cat (a.k.a. Fred) (voiced by Taran Killam) is a yellow house cat and the titular protagonist of the series. When his owners are not home, Fred transforms into his alter-ego Nature Cat, narrating himself as such throughout the show. In this form, he wears a green tunic with a bronze sash and a green hat with a red feather. He is the leader of the Nature Buddies, frequently using the expressions "tally-ho!" and "onward and yonward!" when initiating and continuing his adventures, lending to his optimistic and cheerful attitude in encouraging enthusiasm for the natural world. Actor and comedian Taran Killam appraises Nature Cat as a positive character for children, describing his handling of adversity as "a great example of when you fall down you get back right up... and try it again". He will occasionally drop from his "Nature Cat" persona where, much like a regular housecat, he can suddenly become nervous or frightened. This can include having to interact with water, lamenting "why did it have to be water?", but in these situations he ultimately ends up finding confidence to persist. When Fred turns into Nature Cat his clothes are all green.
- Halbert "Hal" Alexander Dog (voiced by Bobby Moynihan) is an orange Cavalier King Charles Spaniel with brown ears. He is always willing to partake in Nature Cat's outdoor excursions and share discoveries even if he initially doesn't understand them. Hal is generally absent-minded, becoming a source of comic relief where he may respond to others with non-sequiturs or muddled reasoning thought out loud, but can also become blissfully unaware of when he is taken into a dangerous situation. His canine capabilities make him uninhibited in approaching messy or unpleasant situations, such as digging in the ground or smelling strong odors. He is often accompanied by an inanimate chewing toy, "Mr. Chewinsky", who he converses with when projecting his thoughts. Actor and comedian Bobby Moynihan describes him as "kinda represent[ing] the kid in all of us that's like, 'I gotta get out there, I gotta do this, I gotta do this!'. Anything Nature Cat wants him to do, if it's an adventure, he's on board".
- Daisy (voiced by Kate Micucci) is a white and pink bunny who is often the voice of reason of the Nature Buddies. She usually carries a smartphone for use in providing supplementary information when investigating nature. Actress, comedian and musician Kate Micucci describes her as "a really sweet bunny, and she's like the middle child of the group. She's a very innocent character and she's very sweet".
- Squeeks (voiced by Kate McKinnon) is a blue and pink mouse who is the smallest of the Nature Buddies. Actress and comedian Kate McKinnon describes her as "a sass... but sweet and so excited at the same time". At times, Squeeks can act tomboyish and sassy, but she nevertheless stays focused at the task at hand. Though she is the smallest, she doesn't stop being a daring, fearless nature explorer. She is a reliable mouse who is always up for adventure and isn't afraid to get dirty. She also knows a lot of animals that are always eager to help out.
- Ronald (voiced by Kenan Thompson in season 1, and Chris Knowings in seasons 2–5) is a lilac overweight tabby cat and Nature Cat's primary rival, living in the backyard next-door to him. Ronald is competitive, arrogant, fairly obnoxious, vain, and lazy, often lounging around in his hammock. Actor and comedian Kenan Thompson describes him as "always trying to outdo Nature Cat because he knows that Nature Cat's awesome and everybody likes him".

=== Others ===
- Chris Parnell as Sir Galahad, The Announcer, Houston, additional voices
- David Rudman as Leo the Mammoth, additional voices
- Stephanie D'Abruzzo as Alice the Butterfly, additional voices
- Bobby Lee as MC Ferret
- Kate Micucci as Granny Bunny, the grandmother of Daisy
- James Monroe Iglehart as Michael Bluejay (a takeoff on Michael Buble)
- Leslie Carrara-Rudolph as Gracie the Toad, Sadie Dog, Rat, additional voices
- Joey Rudman as Jimmy Cat, Jingles, Steve Vole, additional voices
- Joey Mazzarino as Cruiser
- Fred Armisen as Herbert the Hermit Crab, additional voices
- Rachel Dratch as Flo the Heron, Lulu Ladybug
- Cobie Smulders as Nature Dog
- Dennis Singletary
- Tom Blandford
- Richard Traub
- Lauren Lapkus as Lola the Flamingo
- Chris Jackson
- Cecily Strong as Petunia Bunny, a friend of Daisy, additional voices
- Lena Hall and Tony Vincent provide the vocals for "Dog Gone" (during interlude segments and two episodes (currently))
- Emily Lynne as One Eared Winnie (a.k.a. Gwendolyn), Nature Cat's long-lost twin sister; additional voices
- Jeanne Fishman as Kathy, a spiny lobster.
- Jack Shulruff
- Crystal Monee Hall, Marcus Paul James, and Kristina Nicole Miller as an off-screen chorus for the song "Can You Dig It?!"
- Erica Broder as Leeza, a lizard
- Tyler Bunch as Twig Stickman, Johnny Spins
- Chris and Martin Kratt as Chris and Martin Batt
- Paul Rudolph
- Bill Sherman
- Paul F. Tompkins as Chandler the Toad, additional voices
- Frankie Cordero
- Carmella Riley
- Reggie Miller as Reggie the Toad
- Caroline Bandolik as Leslie
- Frank Cesario
- Jerry Rudman as Jeremiah the Woodchuck
- Seth Humerick
- Ego Nwodim as Gritty Cat and the Bumblebee Queen
- Tommy Rudman

== Broadcast ==
The series premiered in the United States on PBS Kids on November 25, 2015, with it being the highest-rated children's premiere on the network at the time. It aired on Mondays and Wednesdays but was later promoted to each weekday starting January 18, 2016. The original run ended on January 2, 2024.

== International broadcast ==
The series aired on Family Jr. and Family Chrgd in Canada, Discovery Kids in Latin America, E-Junior in the United Arab Emirates and TG4 in Ireland for season 1. It is currently unknown when seasons 2-5 will be airing internationally.

== Discography ==
The show's soundtrack, The Green Album, was released on February 16, 2018 through BMG Rights Management (which also owns the song publishing rights to Nature Cat).

=== Albums ===
- The Green Album (2018)

=== Singles ===
- "Theme Song"
- "Clouds"
