= Young People's Teen Musical Theatre Company =

American performing arts company

Young People's Teen Musical Theatre Company (YPTMTC)
- Formation: 1984
- Type: Theatre group
- Purpose: Musical Theatre, Teen Education
- Location: San Francisco, California, US
- Artistic director: Nicola Bosco-Alvarez
- Website: www.yptmtc.org

The Young People's Teen Musical Theatre Company is a performing arts company located in San Francisco, California. Its mission is to provide exposure to and training in musical theatre and other forms of live performance. Founded in 1984, the group is sponsored by the San Francisco Recreation & Parks Department and supported by a 501(c)(3) non-profit, Friends of the Company.

== History ==
As funding for arts in the public schools was being cut in the early '80s, Diane Price, who taught tap dance at neighborhood playgrounds for the Recreation and Parks Department, realized that children in the city needed an affordable and accessible opportunity to explore the world of musical theatre and the performing arts. She convinced her superiors to let her start a theatre company for teens.

The company offers training in drama, dance, and voice. The group puts on three to four shows per year.

As part of the 30th anniversary celebration, a photo exhibit featuring images of company members and productions through the years was compiled and put on display at the Recreation and Parks department headquarters at McLaren Lodge in Golden Gate Park. In addition, an alumni show featuring former company members who have gone on to have successful careers in the performing arts is planned for December 2015.

== Notable alumni ==
Several members of YPTMTC have won or been finalists in the annual Beach Blanket Babylon Scholarship Competition including Cecilia Foecke (2002, Voice), Philip Ngo (2003, Acting), and Angela Travins (2007, Voice). Many have gone on to have successful careers on Broadway and in Hollywood.

Alumni include 2014 Tony Award Winner Lena Hall (Hedwig and the Angry Inch, Cats), Amir Talai (Harold & Kumar Escape from Guantanamo Bay, What to Expect When You're Expecting), Jaime Rosenstein (Wicked), Anderson Lim (Awesome 80s Prom), Dominic Nolfi (Jersey Boys, Motown: The Musical), Rodney Jackson Jr. (Book of Mormon, Motown), Justin Mendoza (Book of Mormon, Wicked, In The Heights), Vincent Rodriguez III (Crazy Ex-Girlfriend), Melissa Hutchison (The Walking Dead).

== Directors ==
The founder and original director of YPTMTC was Diane Price. Mrs. Price (née Berman) was herself an actress who performed at The Purple Onion, the Opera Ring, Bimbo's 365 Club, The Hungry i, and the Sea Witch, all in San Francisco. She was director of the group from 1984 to her retirement in 2009.

Anne Marie Ullman (née Bookwalter), an alumnus of the YPTMTC, was the director from 2005 through 2007. Anne Marie is currently the theatre director and drama teacher at San Francisco's Jewish Community High School.

Nicola Bosco-Alvarez took over as Director & Choreographer in 2007 after 12 years as an Artist in-Residence and Choreographer with the San Francisco Arts Education Project. Nicola has an Associate Credential of the Cecchetti ISTD (Imperial Society of Teachers of Dancing) and has studied professionally in Florence, Italy.

== Performance history ==
YPTMTC has produced more than 120 shows ranging from classics like West Side Story, A Chorus Line, and South Pacific to more controversial works such as Rent, Spring Awakening, and the Rocky Horror Picture Show, as well as multiple original revues.

In the summer of 2019, the Company joined with three other performing arts organizations, the SF Bay Area Theatre Company (SFBATCO), the San Francisco Arts Education Project Players (SFArtsEd), and the UC Berkeley Summer Symphony in a production of West Side Story. In February 2020, the Company produced the musical The Little Mermaid as a zero-waste, eco-friendly production in which nothing was purchased and little to no waste was produced. The sets and costumes were made from recycled materials.

In addition, the company has performed regularly at Halloween events such as Rec and Parks' Scaregrove and as part of the Fear Oaks Haunt. The company also regularly performs at the tree lighting ceremony in front of the Recreation and Parks Department's headquarters at McLaren Lodge in Golden Gate Park.

=== Production listing ===
- 1984: Bit's & Pieces, A Revue
- 1985: Bits & Pieces II, A Revue
- 1985: Once Upon A Mattress
- 1986: Bits & Pieces III, A Revue
- 1986: Guys and Dolls
- 1986: Summer Stock '86, A Revue
- 1987: How To Succeed In Business Without Really Trying
- 1987: The Fantasticks
- 1987: West Side Story
- 1988: Bits & Pieces 80's Style, A Revue
- 1988: Damn Yankees
- 1988: Joseph and the Amazing Technicolor Dreamcoat
- 1988: Snoopy!
- 1989: Archy and Mehitable
- 1989: Bits & Pieces, The Rock Musicals
- 1989: Hooray for Hollywood
- 1989: Little Shop of Horrors
- 1989: The Pajama Game
- 1990: Bits & Pieces, A Look To The 90's
- 1990: Showstoppers (7th Anniv. Reunion Revue)
- 1990: Smile
- 1990: Stop The World I Want To Get Off (First Alumni Show)
- 1990: The Boy Friend
- 1991: Horrorific Broadway
- 1991: Into The Woods
- 1991: Shakespeare, Soliloquys, Songs & Such
- 1991: Sugar
- 1992: 42nd Street
- 1992: Comic Strip Broadway
- 1992: South Pacific
- 1992: Tribute (to Andrew Lloyd Webber)
- 1993: A Chorus Line
- 1993: Carousel
- 1993: Gypsy
- 1993: Onstage, A Kander & Ebb Revue
- 1993: Tribute II (to Stephen Sondheim)
- 1993: West Side Story
- 1994: Assassins
- 1994: It's A Bird, It's A Plane, It's Superman
- 1994: Jesus Christ Superstar
- 1994: Once Upon A Mattress
- 1994: Showstoppers (10th Anniv. Gala)
- 1994: To Be A Performer
- 1995: British Invasions, a Musical Review
- 1995: Rainbow, a Musical Review
- 1995: Two Gentlemen of Verona
- 1996: Bye Bye Birdie
- 1996: Hot & Cole, a Musical Review
- 1996: The American Clock
- 1997: Blood Brothers
- 1997: By George!
- 1997: More or Loesser
- 1997: On the Town
- 1998: Black on Broadway
- 1998: Kiss Me, Kate
- 1998: Plain and Fancy
- 1998: Ya Gotta Have Hart
- 1999: City of Angels
- 1999: Smile
- 1999: The 90's on Broadway
- 1999: Yip, Yip Hooray!
- 2000: 2000 On Broadway
- 2000: A Tribute To Charles Schulz
- 2000: Company
- 2000: Fiddler on the Roof
- 2000: Into the Woods
- 2000: Tell Me on a Sunday
- 2001: A Chorus Line
- 2001: Bells Are Ringing
- 2001: Side Show
- 2001: The Shakespeare Revue
- 2002: Dames at Sea
- 2002: Fame
- 2002: Sweeney Todd
- 2002: Teens on Broadway
- 2003: "Big" The Musical
- 2003: Damn Yankees
- 2003: On Broadway, the Rock Musicals
- 2003: On the Town
- 2003: Rags (musical)
- 2003: Showstoppers 20 (20th Anniversary Reunion Gala)
- 2004: Strictly Sondheim
- 2004: Wiz-O-Mania
- 2004: The Musical Theater Project
- 2005: A Funny Thing Happened on the Way to the Forum
- 2005: British Invasions
- 2005: Ragtime
- 2005: The Pajama Game
- 2006: Cole
- 2006: Seussical
- 2006: The Most Happy Fella
- 2006: Ya Gotta Have Hart
- 2007: Blood Brothers
- 2007: By George
- 2007: Gypsy
- 2007: History of Musical Theatre
- 2007: Into The Woods
- 2008: Bat Boy
- 2008: Broadway Rocks
- 2008: Pippin
- 2008: The Shakespeare Revue
- 2009: And the World Goes ‘Round
- 2009: Grease
- 2009: HAIR
- 2010: The 25th Annual Putnam County Spelling Bee
- 2010: Once Upon A Broadway
- 2010: Once Upon A Mattress
- 2010: RENT – The School Edition
- 2011: Assassins
- 2011: Into the Woods
- 2011: Saturday Night
- 2012: Cabaret
- 2012: Godspell
- 2012: Spring Awakening
- 2013: Disco Inferno
- 2013: Little Shop of Horrors
- 2014: Cats
- 2014: The Apple Tree
- 2014: The Rocky Horror Show
- 2015: Fiddler on the Roof
- 2015: The Fantasticks
- 2015: Thoroughly Modern Millie
- 2016: American Idiot
- 2016: Big Fish
- 2016: Not Your Mama’s Shakespeare, An Original Revue
- 2017: The Addams Family
- 2017: Bloody Bloody Andrew Jackson
- 2018: Bat Boy
- 2018: Snoopy!
- 2019: Carrie
- 2019: Sister Act
- 2019: West Side Story
- 2020: The Little Mermaid

== Friends of the Company ==
The Friends of the Company is a non-profit organization dedicated to supporting the company, both financially and operationally. It was founded in 2003 to ensure the continuation of the company should the founding director, Diane Price retire.

== Related organizations ==
- SF ArtsEd Players
- SFBATCO
