= Becks (film) =

2017 American musical drama film

- Official movie poster
- Directed by: Daniel Powell; Elizabeth Rohrbaugh
- Written by: Daniel Powell; Elizabeth Rohrbaugh; Rebecca Drysdale
- Produced by: Alex Bach; Steve Salett
- Starring: Lena Hall; Mena Suvari; Christine Lahti; Dan Fogler
- Cinematography: Kat Westergaard
- Music by: Alyssa Robbins; Steve Salett
- Production companies: Irony Point; Outer Borough Pictures
- Distributed by: Blue Fox Entertainment
- Release date: 15 June 2017 (Los Angeles Film Festival)
- Running time: 98 minutes
- Country: USA
- Language: English

Becks is a 2017 American musical drama film directed by Daniel Powell (in his feature directorial debut) and Elizabeth Rohrbaugh, and co-written with Rebecca Drysdale. It stars Lena Hall, Mena Suvari, and Hayley Kiyoko. The film centers on a lesbian musician named Becks who moves back to her childhood home in St. Louis after a failed relationship. Becks premiered at the 2017 Los Angeles Film Festival and won Best Film in the U.S. Fiction category.

== Plot ==
Becks (Hall) is a backup musician for her singer girlfriend, Lucy (Kiyoko), living in New York City. After Lucy is cast in an upcoming aspiring singer reality TV show, she moves to Los Angeles and Becks packs up their apartment and road trips to meet her. When Becks arrives in LA she catches Lucy with another woman. Becks then moves back to her hometown of St. Louis, Missouri to live with her devoutly Catholic mother, Ann (Lahti), who states she is uncomfortable with Becks' sexuality. Becks then rekindles a friendship with her former high school boyfriend, Dave (Fogler), who now owns a bar in town. Becks begins to play shows regularly at the bar and meets Elyse (Suvari), the bored housewife of a man Becks went to high school with. Elyse pays Becks for guitar lessons and they begin a clandestine romance. After Ann catches them having sex, she kicks Becks out of the house. Becks and Elyse plan to move to New York together, but Becks leaves without her and returns to Brooklyn.

== Cast ==
- Lena Hall as Mary Rebecca "Becks"
- Mena Suvari as Elyse
- Christine Lahti as Ann
- Dan Fogler as Dave
- Michael Zegen as Pete
- Hayley Kiyoko as Lucy

== Reception ==
=== Critical response ===
On review aggregator Rotten Tomatoes, the film has a 95% rating based on reviews from 20 critics, and an average rating of 6.9/10. On Metacritic, it received a score of 64 (out of 100) based on seven critics, indicating "generally favorable" reviews. Kimber Myers wrote for The Los Angeles Times, "Sexy and sexually frank, “Becks” works thanks to the musical talent and offbeat charms of its lead. Hall feels authentic at each moment, whether she's strumming a guitar in a dive bar, fighting with her mother or falling in love." In a less positive review, Pat Padua wrote in The Washington Post, "Hall and Suvari have a palpable chemistry, both musically and in their relationship. But despite effective moments, "Becks," like its central character, never finds its footing."

=== Accolades ===
Becks won Best Film in the U.S. Fiction category at the 2017 Los Angeles Film Festival.
