= In the Green =

2019 musical by Grace McLean

- Music: Grace McLean
- Lyrics: Grace McLean
- Book: Grace McLean
- Basis: The life of Hildegard von Bingen
- Productions: 2019 Off-Broadway
- Awards: Richard Rodgers Award for Musical Theater

In the Green is a one-act musical with a book, music, and lyrics by Grace McLean. The show tells the story of medieval composer, mystic, scientist, and Catholic saint Hildegard von Bingen “on her path to sainthood from childhood,” primarily depicting the thirty years she spent locked up in a cell with her mentor, the anchoress Jutta von Sponheim.

The show was commissioned by LCT3 as part of Grace McLean's artist in residency series. The Off-Broadway production premiered at the Claire Tow Theater with previews starting on June 8, 2019, with an official opening date of June 27, 2019 and ran until August 4, 2019. The production was directed by Lee Sunday Evans, with orchestrations by McLean and Kris Kukul, and music direction by Ada Westfall.

In the Green won the Richard Rodgers Award for Musical Theater and was nominated for seven Lucille Lortel Awards, with Grace McLean winning Best Actress in a Musical for her role as Jutta.

== Synopsis ==
In the Green starts with a hymnal song ("O Virga ac Diadema"). The actual storyline begins with Jutta in her cell reading her last rites, choosing to live the rest of her life as a dead person and receiving only food and water left at a small window and preparing for Hildegard's arrival; at 8 years old, a young Hildegard (portrayed by a puppet) is left with Jutta ("Death Ceremony").

Originally, Hildegard (now portrayed by Rachael Duddy as "Eye," Hannah Whitney as "Hand," and Ashley Pérez Flanagan as "Mouth," with each actress holding a puppet of the sense they respectively represent) expresses her resistance to staying in Jutta's cell and desire to go home, before describing how she has too many desires but ultimately wants to be "whole" ("If I Had a Knee"). Jutta then says she too was once "broken like [Hildegard]" and says she will guide Hildegard into becoming whole and "free," with Hildegard agreeing ("The Rule"). Time passes, and Mouth expresses her hunger and her feelings of being inside the cell for so long, before experiencing her first period ("I Am Hungry").

In response, Jutta explains that because of Eve's actions all women must pay and "carry her curse in [their] blood," while also telling Mouth to repress her hunger to gain control over herself and become whole as she aims ("Eve"). A year passes, with Hildegard becoming more frustrated that she is still broken ("Ritual"). Jutta continues to teach Hildegard lessons to become whole, this time saying that they will spend more time dead than alive and advising her to stop wanting things, to stop sleeping, and continue digging since life is painful anyway ("Little Life"). The two women take a break, and seeing a ray of sunlight coming through the cell window, Hand describes her time outside with a woman named Agatha while Jutta remembers her past betrothal and subsequent running away, before Hand asks about being "free" and going outside ("Sun Song"). This conversation with Hand brings back suppressed memories where Shadow (Jutta's repressed trauma personified) and Jutta sing about her would-be husband finding her after running away, and Jutta's sexual assault in a garden; Jutta refuses to think on this, forcing Shadow to leave and covering the sunlight, before arguing with Hildegard ("In the Green").

All three aspects of Hildegard get angry at Jutta, and Jutta decides she will no longer help Hildegard become whole. Eye, Hand, and Mouth all turn on each other and blame each other for Agatha's death, falling apart and choosing to "dig" because Hildegard believes she will never become whole and digging is the only thing she can control ("Burial"). While digging, Shadow is found in the Underground (a place full of darkness) hiding since she is unwanted, and tells Hildegard that she can join Shadow in the Underground ("Underground"). While in the Underground, Hildegard and Eye, Hand, and Mouth piece together the memories that make Hildegard broken; she remembers Agatha (who the audience now understands to be Hildegard's elder sister) sneaking out at night and having sex with a man, telling her mother about what Agatha is doing, describing Agatha's pregnancy and their nighttime outing to pick pennyroyal so Agatha can abort her baby, which leads to Agatha bleeding to death ("Confession"). Hildegard pauses before describing the last thing Agatha told her as she was dying, to which Shadow tells her she doesn't have to, but once Hildegard does, she feels better, even if she's still broken ("Sun Song (Reprise)"). Shadow is in awe of Hildegard, Eye, Hand, and Mouth for working with their trauma and wants them to stay with her in the Underground; realizing that Shadow is Underground because she too was broken by her trauma, they try to encourage her to share her memories so Shadow can become whole, to which Shadow refuses ("Light Undercover").

Through these conversations, Hildegard has a realization about becoming whole and understands that everything Jutta has been trying to teach her has always been inside of her, and with the help of each other Shadow and Hildegard feel they'll be "alright" ("The First Verb"). Shadow and Hildegard move from the Underground back into Jutta's cell ("O Viridissima Virga"). Hildegard, Eye, Hand, and Mouth tell Shadow that she too contains light like them, and that's what they've been digging for this whole time; they've been hiding themselves and while those hidden parts make them broken, that is how they have the light they've been searching. Emboldened by Hildegard, Eye, Hand, and Mouth, Shadow divulges some of her feelings and the sensations she remembers from her sexual assault ("Light Undercover/In the Green (Reprise)"). Meanwhile, Jutta steadfastly refuses to acknowledge anything Hildegard or Shadow say. Jutta reflects on her own life, saying she's "done all the things [she's] supposed to" and yet cannot see the light like Hildegard or Shadow, but is grateful for her life all the same. She expresses maternal love for Hildegard, before dying ("The Ripening"). Hildegard, Eye, Hand, and Mouth reflect on Jutta's teachings while grieving their mentor's death ("Forgiveness"). Hildegard leaves the cell to experience what she's "never known before." She then explains her thoughts on Catholicism through her life and the growing corruption and tensions within the Church ("Integration"). The show ends with Hildegard meeting Sigewize, a young Cathar girl who expresses similar sentiments to Hildegard at the beginning of the show of being "'too much,'" trying to be understood, and asks Hildegard to "see [her]" and think about the impact of her speeches when people kill in Hildegard's name ("Exorcism").

== Musical numbers ==
The role of Hildegard is played by a trio of actors throughout the show. The lyrics of “O Virga ac Diadema” and “O Viridissima Virga” were originally written by Hildegard von Bingen.

- "O Virga ac Diadema" - Company
- "Death Ceremony" - Jutta and Company
- "If I Had a Knee" - Hildegard and Jutta
- "The Rule" - Jutta and Hildegard
- "I Am Hungry" - Jutta and Hildegard
- "Eve" - Jutta and Hildegard
- "Ritual" - Hildegard and Jutta
- "Little Life" - Jutta and Hildegard
- "Sun Song" - Jutta and Hildegard
- "In the Green" - Jutta and Shadow
- "Burial" - Hildegard and Jutta
- "Underground" - Shadow
- "Confession" - Hilegard
- "Sun Song (Reprise)" - Hildegard
- "Light Undercover" - Shadow and Hildegard
- "The First Verb" - Hildegard and Shadow
- "O Viridissima Virga" - Shadow and Hildegard
- "Light Undercover / In the Green (Reprise)" - Hildegard and Shadow
- "The Ripening" - Jutta
- "Forgiveness" - Hildegard and Company
- "Integration" - Hildegard
- "Exorcism" - Sigewize and Hildegard

== Cast and characters ==
Character	Off-Broadway (2019)
Hildegard (Eye), Volmar	Rachael Duddy
Hildegard (Hand)	Hannah Whitney
Hildegard (Mouth), Hildegard's Mother, Marchioness	Ashley Pérez Flanagan
Jutta	Grace McLean
Shadow, Sigewize	Mia Pak

== Critical response ==
The New York Times’ Ben Brantley refers to the musical’s “audacity and opacity,” while Raven Snook from Time Out New York writes “McLean’s promise shines through this fascinating if flawed experiment.”

== Recording ==
The original cast recording of In the Green was released digitally and for streaming October 16, 2020 by Ghostlight Records. A physical CD is meant to be released by the end of the year.

== Awards and nominations ==
Year	Award	Category	Nominee	Result
2020	Richard Rodgers Awards for Musical Theater	Staged Reading Award		Won
2020	Lucille Lortel Awards	Outstanding Musical		Nominated
2020	Lucille Lortel Awards	Outstanding Lead Actress in a Musical	Grace McLean	Won
2020	Lucille Lortel Awards	Outstanding Featured Actress in a Musical	Ashley Pérez Flanagan	Nominated
2020	Lucille Lortel Awards	Outstanding Costume Design	Oana Botez	Nominated
2020	Lucille Lortel Awards	Outstanding Lighting Design	Barbara Samuels	Nominated
2020	Lucille Lortel Awards	Outstanding Sound Design	Nicholas Pope	Nominated
