= Lena Hall =

American actress and singer (born 1980)

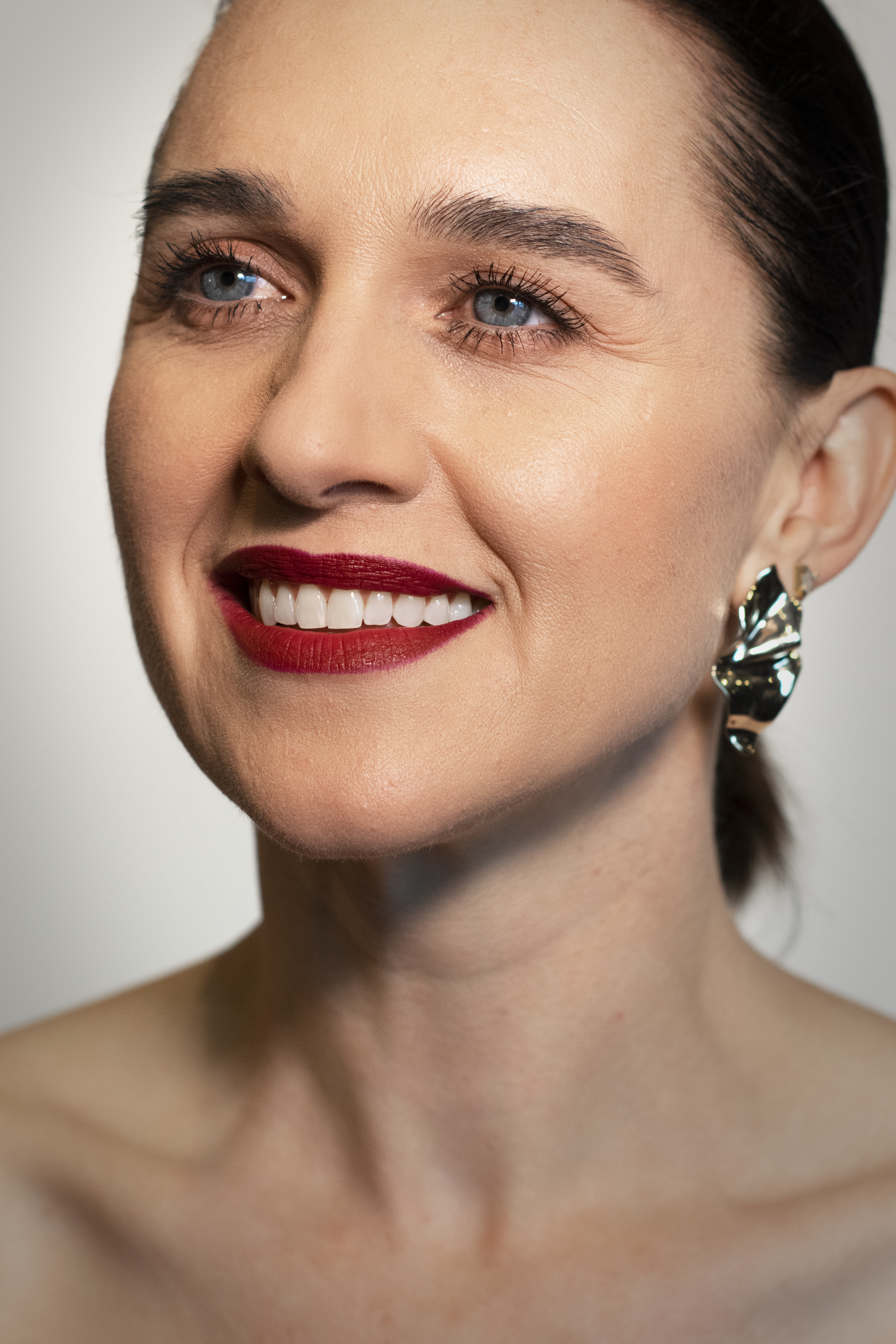
- Hall in 2022
- Born: Celina Consuela Gabriella Carvajal; January 30, 1980 (age 46); San Francisco, California, U.S.
- Occupations: Actress; singer
- Years active: 1998–present
- Spouse: Jonathan Stein (m. 2019; div. 2025)
- Website: lenahall.com

Celina Consuela Gabriella Carvajal (born January 30, 1980), known professionally as Lena Hall, is an American actress and singer. She won the Tony Award for her performance as Yitzhak in the 2014 revival of Hedwig and the Angry Inch, which also earned her a Grammy nomination for the musical's official album. She made history by becoming the first person to play both Hedwig and Yitzhak in the same production during the national tour of the musical in 2016. She originated the role of Nicola in the Broadway musical Kinky Boots. Her other Broadway credits include Cats, 42nd Street, Dracula, the Musical and Tarzan, the Musical. Hall has also starred in Off-Broadway productions such as Radiant Baby, Bedbugs!!!, Rooms: A Rock Romance, The Toxic Avenger, Prometheus Bound, Chix6, Little Shop of Horrors, and the 2017 original play How to Transcend a Happy Marriage.

Hall has appeared in films such as Sex and the City (2008), The Graduates (2008), Born from the Foot (2009), The Big Gay Musical (2009), and Becks (2017), for which she received widespread critical acclaim. She has also appeared on TV shows like ABC's All My Children, HBO's Girls, Amazon Prime's Good Girls Revolt, and voiced the role of Countess Coloratura on My Little Pony: Friendship Is Magic. In 2020, she joined the cast of TNT's science fiction epic Snowpiercer as Miss Audrey.

Hall was the lead singer of the band The Deafening, they released an album with original songs in 2012 titled Central Booking. In 2015, Hall released her first solo album, Sin & Salvation: Live At the Carlyle.

== Biography ==
Celina Consuela Gabriella Carvajal was born in San Francisco, California, on January 30, 1980, to Carlos and Carolyn (née Houser) Carvajal. Her father is a ballet dancer, choreographer and the co-artistic director for the annual San Francisco Ethnic Dance Festival; her mother was a prima ballerina and is now a yoga master.

She has Swedish, Spanish & Filipino ancestry. Her paternal grandfather arrived from Southeast Asia Philippines to San Francisco in 1926, and her paternal grandmother is Swedish. Her sister is Calliope "Calli" Carvajal, a hair stylist.

She is a graduate of Ruth Asawa San Francisco School of the Arts, where she first studied dance, and an alumna of the Young People's Teen Musical Theatre Company in San Francisco.

Her first big break was singing for Pope John Paul II at Candlestick Park in San Francisco for over 50,000 people at the age of 7.

Hall changed her professional name from "Celina Carvajal" to Lena Hall in 2013, saying she had created it for her music persona and now wanted to use it for her acting career as well. She explained her name change to Broadway.com: "Multiple people in the industry suggested I have one name for everything. [Lena Hall] is just two shortenings of my first name and my last name. So Lena Hall is Celina Carvajal. It seemed like an easier way of people getting to know me. Lena Hall is a nice symmetrical name, and it reminds people of Lena Horne, who was a singer. And when people hear my name, I want them to think of a singer". She later found out that "Carvajal" is actually a stage name taken seven generations back that became a family name. Hall said that it was one of the reasons why she was able to let go of the Carvajal name because it was a stage name, and it felt like her ancestors would agree with her name change.

== Career ==
Hall made her Broadway debut in 1999 in Cats, taking over the role of Demeter after first performing in the national tour in 1998. She next took over the role of Ann "Anytime Annie" Reilly in 42nd Street. She also performed in a national tour of Annie Get Your Gun, understudying the lead role of Annie Oakley.

In 2003, Hall appeared in Radiant Baby, a musical about artist Keith Haring, in various roles. In 2004 she was in the original ensemble of Dracula, the Musical, and was the understudy for Kelli O'Hara as Lucy Westenra. In 2006 she was in the original ensemble of the musical Tarzan, and was also the understudy for Jennifer Gambatese as Jane Porter.

In 2008, she competed in the reality show Legally Blonde: The Musical: The Search for Elle Woods, a competition to be cast as Elle Woods in the Broadway production of Legally Blonde, and was the 3rd contestant eliminated, and starred in the Off-Broadway musicals Green Eyes, and Bedbugs!!!, in which she played the role of Carly at the New York Musical Theatre Festival.

In 2009, she was the understudy for Leslie Kritzer in the role of Monica P. Miller in the musical Rooms: A Rock Romance. Also in 2009, she took over the lead role of Sarah in the musical The Toxic Avenger at the New World Stages.

In 2011, she performed as Daughter of the Ocean in the musical Prometheus Bound, inspired by Aeschylus's Ancient Greek tragedy, at the American Repertory Theater, and also appeared as Blaze in the musical Chix6. In 2013, Hall originated the role of Nicola (played on film by Jemima Rooper) in the musical Kinky Boots, which won the Tony Award for Best Musical at the 67th Tony Awards.

In 2013, her band The Deafening released an album with original songs titled Central Booking.

In 2014, Hall was cast as Yitzhak in the Broadway production Hedwig and the Angry Inch, (a role previously played Off-Broadway by Miriam Shor) opposite Neil Patrick Harris, for which she won the Tony Award for Best Featured Actress in a Musical at the 68th Tony Awards. She left the role on April 4, 2015, after playing Yitzhak opposite Harris, Darren Criss, Michael C. Hall, Andrew Rannells and John Cameron Mitchell as Hedwig. In 2016, she was cast in the national tour of Hedwig, which opened on October 2, 2016, reprising her role as Yitzhak, and for one performance a week, playing the title role of Hedwig for a total of eight performances in Los Angeles and San Francisco, making her the first actor to play both roles in the same production. She played the roles in San Francisco and Los Angeles alongside Glee star Darren Criss.

Following her run in Hedwig and the Angry Inch, Hall toured North America alongside Josh Groban on his Stages Tour.

On September 28, 2015, Hall released her first solo album, Sin & Salvation: Live At the Carlyle, featuring her renditions of songs from artists such as Led Zeppelin, Tori Amos, Hozier, and James Brown. The album was recorded at the Carlyle Hotel during Hall's musical show Sin & Salvation, which ran for two weeks.

Her TV work include 9 episodes of All My Children in the role of Treena in 2009, Juicy Lucy in Good Girls Revolt (2015), the voice of Countess Coloratura/Rara in the 115th episode of My Little Pony: Friendship Is Magic, titled "The Mane Attraction".

In 2016, Hall played Holly, a seductive yoga instructor in an episode of the HBO series Girls. She also performed the songs along with Tony Vincent for the fictional band "Dog Gone" in the 2015 PBS series Nature Cat.

She has appeared in the movies Sex and the City (2008), The Graduates (2008), Born from the Foot (2009), The Big Gay Musical (2009), and Becks (2017), in which she plays the title role and her first leading role in a feature film, and received widespread critical acclaim for her performance. It won the U.S. Fiction Award at the LA Film Festival.

In 2017, Hall starred in the role of Pip on Sarah Ruhl's Off-Broadway play How to Transcend a Happy Marriage starring opposite Marisa Tomei at the Lincoln Center.

Hall released a series of 12 digital EPs titled Obsessed in 2018, one per month. The January release consists of selections from Hedwig and the Angry Inch, while each of the others features her renditions of several songs by a different artist.

In 2021, Hall voice acted in a live-streamed reading of a science fiction screenplay called Aurora by Joe Scott, playing multiple roles. The reading, which served as Scott's YouTube channel's Halloween special and centered around the Aurora, Texas, UFO incident, saw its proceeds donated to Team Seas.

== Personal life ==
In December 2018, Hall announced her engagement to Jonathan Stein. They married on May 27, 2019. The two filed for divorce in August 2024, and the divorce was finalized in December 2025.

== Discography ==
=== Studio albums ===
Title	Details
The Villa Satori: Growing up Haight Ashbury	Released: April 10, 2020; Label: Self-released; Formats: Digital download
1001	Released: April 29, 2022; Label: Self-released; Formats: Digital download

=== Live albums ===
Title	Details
Sin & Salvation: Live At the Carlyle	Released: September 27, 2015; Label: Self-released; Formats: CD, Digital download

=== Extended plays ===
Title	Details	Peak chart positions	
Title	Details	US Heat.	US Indie
Obsessed: Hedwig and the Angry Inch	Released: January 5, 2018; Label: Sh-K-Boom; Formats: Digital download	15	44
Obsessed: Peter Gabriel	Released: February 2, 2018; Label: Sh-K-Boom; Formats: Digital download	—	—
Obsessed: Elton John	Released: March 2, 2018; Label: Sh-K-Boom; Formats: Digital download	—	—
Obsessed: The Cranberries	Released: April 6, 2018; Label: Sh-K-Boom; Formats: Digital download	—	—
Obsessed: Pink	Released: May 4, 2018; Label: Sh-K-Boom; Formats: Digital download	—	—
Obsessed: Radiohead	Released: June 1, 2018; Label: Sh-K-Boom; Formats: Digital download	—	—
Obsessed: Jack White	Released: July 6, 2018; Label: Sh-K-Boom; Formats: Digital download	—	—
Obsessed: David Bowie	Released: August 3, 2018; Label: Sh-K-Boom; Formats: Digital download	—	—
Obsessed: Beck	Released: September 7, 2018; Label: Sh-K-Boom; Formats: Digital download	—	—
Obsessed: Muse	Released: October 5, 2018; Label: Sh-K-Boom; Formats: Digital download	—	—
Obsessed: Nirvana	Released: November 2, 2018; Label: Sh-K-Boom; Formats: Digital download	—	—
Obsessed: Chris Cornell	Released: December 7, 2018; Label: Sh-K-Boom; Formats: Digital download	—	—

=== Other album appearances ===
- Tarzan (Original Broadway Cast Recording) (2004)
- Dracula (Original Broadway Cast Recording) (2006)
- Central Booking (2012) – with The Deafening
- Kinky Boots (Original Broadway Cast Recording) (2013)
- Hedwig and the Angry Inch (Original Broadway Cast Recording) (2014)
- Pinkie Pie's Party Playlist (2016)
- Desmond Child Live (2019) – Desmond Child
- Home Street Home, Volume 1 (2020)

== Filmography ==
=== Film ===
Year	Title	Role	Notes
2008	Sex and the City	Twenty-Something Girl No. 4	(as Celina Carvajal)
2008	The Graduates	Inga	(as Celina Carvajal)
2009	Born from the Foot	Barney	(as Celina Carvajal)
2009	The Big Gay Musical	Wife / Eve	(as Celina Carvajal)
2014	Russian Broadway Shut Down	Lesbian	Short film
2017	Becks	Becks	
2025	Honey Don't!	Elle (piano bar)	

=== Television ===
Year	Title	Role	Notes
2008	Legally Blonde: The Musical – The Search for Elle Woods	Herself	5 episodes (as Celina Carvajal)
2008	All My Children	Treena	9 episodes (as Celina Carvajal)
2015	BoJack Horseman	One-Night Stand (voice)	Episode: "Yesterdayland"
2015	Good Girls Revolt	Juicy Lucy	Episode: "Pilot"
2015	My Little Pony: Friendship Is Magic	Countess Coloratura / Rara (voice)	Episode: "The Mane Attraction"
2015–2024	Nature Cat	Missy Dog (voice)	Episode: "The Treasure of Bad Dog Bart/Pet Sounds", "Freezin' in the Summer Season/Total Eclipse of the Sun", interlude segments
2016	Girls	Holly	Episode: "Queen for Two Days"
2020–2024	Snowpiercer	Miss Audrey	Main cast (32 episodes)
2022	Evil	Marie Taylor	Episode: "The Demon of Algorithms"
2024	Sausage Party: Foodtopia	"Can of Tuna" Singer (voice)	Episode: "Fourth Course"
2025–present	Your Friends & Neighbors	Alison "Ali" Cooper	Main cast
2025	Sub/liminal		

== Theater ==
Year	Title	Role	Notes
1998–1999	Cats	Demeter (Replacement) / Bombalurina (Replacement) / Cassandra (Replacement)	National tour
1999–2000	Cats	Demeter (Replacement)	Broadway, Winter Garden Theatre
2000	Annie Get Your Gun	Annie Oakley (Understudy)	National tour
2000	On a Clear Day You Can See Forever	Dancing Ensemble	Off-Broadway, Encores! Concert
2001	42nd Street	Annie Reilly (Understudy)	Broadway, Lyric Theatre
2003	Radiant Baby	IV / Pop Girl / Business Person / Prom Goer / New Yorker / SVA Student / Graffiti Artist / Celebrity / Gallery Owner / Art Patron / Bath Boy / Police	Off-Broadway, Joseph Papp Public Theater / Newman Theater
2004	Dracula, the Musical	Second Vampire / Ensemble (Original) / Lucy Westenra (Understudy)	Broadway, Belasco Theatre
2006	Tarzan, the Musical	Ensemble (Original) / Jane Porter (Understudy)	Broadway, Richard Rodgers Theatre
2008	Green Eyes	Singer (Original)	Off-Broadway, Theatre 80
2008	Bedbugs!!!	Carly (Original)	Off-Broadway, New York Musical Theatre Festival
2009	Rooms: A Rock Romance	Monica P. Miller (Understudy)	Off-Broadway, New World Stages Stage II
2009	The Toxic Avenger	Sarah (Replacement)	Off-Broadway, New World Stages Stage I
2010	The Last Goodbye	Rosaline	Williamstown Theatre Festival
2011	Prometheus Bound	Daughter of the Ocean (Original)	American Repertory Theater
2011	Chix6	Blaze	Off-Broadway, Queens Theatre
2013–2014	Kinky Boots	Nicola (Original)	Broadway, Al Hirschfeld Theatre
2014–2015	Hedwig and the Angry Inch	Yitzhak (Original)	Broadway, Belasco Theatre
2016	Hedwig and the Angry Inch	Yitzhak Hedwig (Alternate)	National tour, Los Angeles and San Francisco
2017	How to Transcend a Happy Marriage	Pip (Original)	Off-Broadway, Mitzi E. Newhouse Theater
2019	Bat Out of Hell	Sloane	New York City Center
2022–2023	Little Shop of Horrors	Audrey (Replacement)	Off-Broadway, Westside Theatre
2022	Chess	Florence Vassey	Entertainment Community Fund Benefit Concert, Broadhurst Theatre
2023	In Dreams	Kenna	World premiere: Leeds Playhouse, Ed Mirvish Theatre
2024	Gutenberg! The Musical!	Producer (One night only)	Broadway, James Earl Jones Theatre

== Awards and nominations ==
Year	Award	Category	Nominated work	Result
2008	NYMF Excellence Awards	Outstanding Individual Performance	Bedbugs!!!	Won
2014	Tony Award	Best Featured Actress in a Musical	Hedwig and the Angry Inch	Won
2014	Drama League Award	Distinguished Performance	Hedwig and the Angry Inch	Nominated
2014	Broadway.com Audience Awards	Favorite Featured Actress in a Musical	Hedwig and the Angry Inch	Nominated
2015	Grammy Award	Best Musical Theater Album	Hedwig and the Angry Inch	Nominated
2017	Los Angeles Drama Critics Circle Award	Featured Performance	Hedwig and the Angry Inch	Nominated
