= List of Nature Cat episodes =

The following is a list of episodes from the television series Nature Cat. During the course of the series, 98 episodes of Nature Cat were released over five seasons, between November 25, 2015, and April 3, 2025.

== Series overview ==
Season	Segments	Episodes	Originally released	
Season	Segments	Episodes	First released	Last released
1	76	38 (Note: Although Season 1 technically has 40 episodes, two episodes are omitted from this total count, as they are "Part 1" and "Part 2" of the one-hour "Ocean Commotion" special.)	November 25, 2015	September 15, 2017
Specials	—N/a	5	June 19, 2017	April 3, 2025
2	40	20	January 1, 2018	April 17, 2019
3	30	15	April 18, 2019	June 4, 2021
4	20	10	May 9, 2022	September 23, 2022
5	20	10	April 17, 2023	January 2, 2024

== Episodes ==
=== Season 1 (2015–17) ===
No. overall	No. in season	Title	Original release date	Prod. code
1	1	"Heartthrob Hamster"	November 25, 2015	NCAT-000101
1	1	"Astronuts"	November 25, 2015	NCAT-000101
"Heartthrob Hamster" (Note: This episode was part of a special "Nature Cat Premiere" event, which included "Heartthrob Hamster", "Astronuts", and "Muck Amok", on November 25, 2015.) – Nature Cat and the rest are tasked to pet-sit their neighbor's hamster, Sir Galahad. Playing on Squeeks' infatuation with him, Galahad insists on briefly coming out of the cage. Galahad escapes after the cage lid is removed by Hal as Daisy insists he won't. Nature Cat leads in tracing the hamster, observing signs animals leave behind. "Astronuts" – Nature Cat wishes to be the first cat to walk on the moon, piquing the interest of the rest. After Nature Cat, Hal and Squeeks unsuccessfully try to catapult themselves into the sky, Daisy designs a rocket ship. They follow her plan, learning the complications and requirements involved in space travel.
2	2	"Muck Amok"	November 27, 2015	NCAT-000102
2	2	"Follow Those Footprints"	November 27, 2015	NCAT-000102
"Muck Amok" – Squeeks' cousin Marvin and other residents located in the marsh are at risk of or are suffering flooding to their homes. Nature Cat and the rest investigate and eventually resolve the situation by learning how the dynamics of water contribute to the marsh, and how the presence of rubbish obstructs it. After they clean it up, other mice who live there arrive: Buster, Harold, Mary and Zazu. Then Nature Cat and his friends' number one fan, Doggone the poodle, plays a marsh-themed concert with her 3 band-mates. "Follow Those Footprints" – On Nature Art Day, Nature Cat unveils a sculpture of himself constructed from acorns, finding that the head is gone. Footprints are found on the ground surrounding the sculpture. They first distinguish the footprints from their own, by size and shape, and follow the trail to find the culprit.
3	3	"Breezy Rider"	November 30, 2015	NCAT-000103
3	3	"Swamp Thing"	November 30, 2015	NCAT-000103
"Breezy Rider" – Nature Cat and the rest are flying kites in the park. A strong gust pulls Squeeks and her kite into a tree on a nearby island. To reach her, Daisy designs a sail raft which she and the others build. They learn to navigate water, while Squeeks becomes increasingly in danger. Will this be the end of Squeeks? "Swamp Thing" – Daisy learns of the legend of 'The Swamp Thing', a monstrous creature which exists in the swamp who is responsible for its sounds, smell and appearance. They venture into the swamp, in spite of Nature Cat's trepidation which he contains throughout, finding natural phenomena are causing 'The Swamp Thing'.
4	4	"The Treasure of Bad Dog Bart"	December 7, 2015	NCAT-000104
4	4	"Pet Sounds"	December 7, 2015	NCAT-000104
"The Treasure of Bad Dog Bart" – Hal uncovers a treasure map, understood to be attributed to the legend of "Bad Dog Bart", who stole the neighbourhood dogs' toys and buried them elsewhere. They read and follow the map, learning to reference objects of geography, cardinal directions and size of relative distances against symbols on the map. "Pet Sounds" – Nature Cat and his friends are preparing to perform in the band competition "Battle of the Pet Bands", but their instruments become waterlogged by falling into the ocean. They still insist in competing in determination to rival 'DJ Ronald', constructing instruments from items in the environment.
5	5	"Cave Conundrum"	December 14, 2015	NCAT-000105
5	5	"Daisy's Colossal Fossil"	December 14, 2015	NCAT-000105
"Cave Conundrum" – Hal loses his flying disc, of considerable sentimental value, named 'Harold'. It is seen to follow the path of a stream which leads into a cave. Nature Cat and the rest explore the cave, learning of the safety, the geological history, rock formations, and creatures which live in the cave. "Daisy's Colossal Fossil" – While adding to her flower patch, Daisy unearths a mysterious item. With the help of the rest, they fully dig it out and learn it is a fossilised bone. Daisy fantasizes about the bone's origin, exploring prehistoric life. She and the rest create a salad for a mammoth named Leo she meets.
6	6	"There's Gold in Them Thar Hills"	December 28, 2015	NCAT-000106
6	6	"Nature Cat and Mr. Hide"	December 28, 2015	NCAT-000106
"There's Gold in Them Thar Hills" – Squeeks finds a small piece of gold in the stream, but inadvertently loses it. To cheer her up, Nature Cat and his friends adventure back to the stream to do all they can to try to find another piece for Squeeks. "Nature Cat and Mr. Hide" – Nature Cat is hoping to beat Ronald at the Neighborhood Hide and Seek Championship: Cat Edition. He learns what animals in the wild use to conceal themselves: camouflage.
7	7	"Where Have All the Butterflies Gone?!"	January 11, 2016	NCAT-000107
7	7	"For The Birdies!"	January 11, 2016	NCAT-000107
"Where Have All the Butterflies Gone?" – Daisy starts a playdate with her butterfly friends, but there is a risk because there are no flowers around for the butterflies to feed on. Nature Cat and his pals decide to build a new butterfly garden so that the butterflies don't fly off. "For The Birdies" – Nature Cat's admiration for birds inspires him to help them. He learns that the upcoming winter season poses difficulty for birds to feed. Nature Cat and his friends set out to build bird feeders to give the birds a much needed food boost for the incoming season.
8	8	"Stream and Shout"	January 18, 2016	NCAT-000109
8	8	"Hal's Day Off"	January 18, 2016	NCAT-000109
"Stream and Shout" – Nature Cat investigates where streams begin and end. "Hal's Day Off" – After unintentionally boarding a truck which drove off, Nature Cat, Squeeks and Daisy goes to find Hal, who's becomes lost in the 150,000-acre city of Chicago, Illinois. During the search they come across street animals and learn of their feeding behaviour and how the cohabit the urban human environment before finding Hal. Would this be the end of Hal? "Note:" Beginning with this episode, the XQ Super School Project commercial replaced the 23andMe commercial.
9	9	"Tally Ho! A Rainbow"	January 18, 2016	NCAT-000110
9	9	"Travelin' Seeds"	January 18, 2016	NCAT-000110
"Tally Ho! A Rainbow!" – Nature Cat and the rest searched for a rainbow for picture with the rainbow for Granny Bunny, in efforts to do, Nature Cat sets out to prove the brief glimpses of a rainbow he saw to the rest, realising and learning of the conditions that cause a rainbow. "Travelin' Seeds" – Daisy questions the origin of a flower in her garden, having not planted a seed for it. The rest observe that seeds can travel from remote locations through natural processes, seeking the origin of flower's seeds. Along the way they further observe the processes of how seeds travel from other flora.
10	10	"Ant's Revolution"	January 19, 2016	NCAT-000108
10	10	"Tide Pool Tough"	January 19, 2016	NCAT-000108
"Ant's Revolution" – Squeeks has a picnic suddenly goes awry when ants steal Squeeks' cheesecake. Nature Cat and his friends try to get the dessert back, but they're out of luck as they watch the ants bring the cheesecake down into their anthole. "Tide Pool Tough" – Nature Cat wants to join his friends surfing in the ocean, but he is scared of the water. After getting some help from the tide pool creatures in training to face water by learning about the tide pool creatures, he becomes 'tide pool tough' and joins his friends surfing.
11	11	"Hooray, It's Arbor Day"	January 20, 2016	NCAT-000111
11	11	"Goodnight, Gracie"	January 20, 2016	NCAT-000111
"Hooray, It's Arbor Day" – Nature Cat and Squeeks help a family of Opossums find a new home after their tree falls during a windstorm. "Good Night Gracie" – Nature Cat and company helps Gracie the Toad find a perfect place to hibernate for the winter.
12	12	"Love You, Michael Bluejáy"	January 21, 2016	NCAT-000112
12	12	"Ze Worm Whisperer"	January 21, 2016	NCAT-000112
"Love You, Michael Bluejáy" – Nature Cat and the rest hear that the singer 'Michael Bluejáy' is to appear at a concert. In the excitement of them all, they organise themselves to trail down a hiking path in order to reach the concert, becoming lost and learning how to handle such situations when hiking. "Ze Worm Whisper" – Daisy is working on her garden patch. She attributes the poor quality soil to the absence of worms. Hal transforms into 'Ze Worm Whisperer', and introduces worms to the garden. Nature Cat is initially averse to handling worms, but by learning of their importance he eventually befriends them.
13	13	"Happy Halentine's Day!"	February 2, 2016	NCAT-000114
13	13	"The Groundhog Way"	February 2, 2016	NCAT-000114
"Happy Halentines Day" – Hal intends to buy gifts for his friends and mother, but is despaired to find he forgot to buy anything and that Valentine's Day involves waste harmful to nature. Before Hal gives up, Nature Cat and the rest suggest that instead he makes handmade gifts made from elements of nature. "The Groundhog Way" – Hal anticipates snow for his birthday. It is Groundhog Day where the neighborhood animals consult the groundhog whether spring is to come early, but the groundhog's reclusive and uncertain. Nature Cat, challenged against Ronald, attempts predicting weather by discerning certain myths from truths in what can predict the future climate.
14	14	"Star Gazers"	February 18, 2016	NCAT-000113
14	14	"A Jump to Remember"	February 18, 2016	NCAT-000113
"Star Gazers" – Nature Cat and the rest go stargazing in anticipation of viewing a meteor shower, learning how to determine astronomical objects in the sky. Nature Cat falls asleep and has a dream, in which he meets a lost alien named Shirley. Nature Cat suggests using stellar navigation, venturing space and learning the constellations of the sky. "A Jump to Remember" – Nature Cat attempts to break a ski jump world record. Ronald intrudes, gloating that he holds the current record and there needs to be snow for the attempt to be valid. Nature Cat insists on bringing about snow, learning the conditions needed and how to artificially produce it by spraying moisture in cold air.
15	15	"Earth Day Today"	April 25, 2016	NCAT-000117
15	15	"Earth Day Every Day"	April 25, 2016	NCAT-000117
"Earth Day Today" – When Nature Cat and his friends decide to go on a nature hike over to Butterfly Hills, they keep running into plastic bags blowing in the wind. When they see those bags come from local stores, they attempt alerting the store, learning and propose an alternative solution to carry groceries. "Earth Day Every Day" – Continuing from 'Earth Day Today' with an alternative in place for the plastic bag, they find a plastic bottle floating in a stream. Nature Cat and his friends try to properly dispose the bottle, discovering more plastic waste elsewhere and in the ocean, eventually learning 'Earth Day is every day'.
16	16	"Kingdom of Rotting Log Can You Dig It?"	April 26, 2016	NCAT-000115
"Kingdom of Rotting Log" – Nature Cat and his friends want to build their royal castle in the woods, but there is a rotting log obstructing. While attempting removing the log, they're persistently interrupted. Squeeks goes into the log and finds a habitat of creatures, learning the importance of rotting logs to a forests' ecosystem. "Can You Dig It?" – Nature Cat and his friends are looking to answer 'number 73' on 'Nature Cat's Curiosity List', 'if you keep digging a hole deeper and deeper, where will they end up?' They enter a machine Daisy designed which supposedly drills through the Earth, learning about the various layers of the Earth.
17	17	"Mud Love"	April 27, 2016	NCAT-000116
17	17	"Call It a Night"	April 27, 2016	NCAT-000116
"Mud Love" – Hal is having a party for 'mud appreciation day', while finding and learning of various kinds of mud and their properties, to each kind Nature Cat remains obstinate that he "...doesn't like mud at all!", which he emphatically recites as a rhyme. This episode is similar to Green Eggs and Ham. "Call it a Night" – Nature Cat loses his hat and explores the wonders of night.
18	18	"Woodpecker Picks a Place"	April 28, 2016	NCAT-000118
18	18	"Here Comes the Sun"	April 28, 2016	NCAT-000118
"Woodpecker Picks a Place" – When Nature Cat's band practice keeps getting interrupted by woodpeckers pecking on the roof of Hal's doghouse, the four friends find out more about woodpeckers and what exactly one is looking for. "Here Comes the Sun" – Nature Cat leads his friends to go see the Golden Sunstone. However, when Nature Cat accidentally breaks the compass, his friends find other ways to determine which direction to go.
19	19	"The Great Grasshopper Race"	May 23, 2016	NCAT-000119
19	19	"Fall for Hal"	May 23, 2016	NCAT-000119
"The Great Grasshopper Race" – Hal's grasshopper friend Dustin Hopman is competing in the Great Grasshopper Race. But before the race starts, Dustin suddenly hops off into the woods. Nature Cat and his friends try to look for him before that race starts. "Fall for Hal" – The first day of fall is Hal's favorite day of the year. However, the problem is that Hal is sick and can't get out of bed. However, Nature Cat comes up with a great idea to bring fall and all the items on his scavenger list to Hal.
20	20	"Playground-Palooza"	May 24, 2016	NCAT-000120
20	20	"Small But Big"	May 24, 2016	NCAT-000120
"Playground-Palooza" – Sadie, a dog who lives in the city, reminisces about playing in the woods with Nature Cat and the rest. Nature Cat realizes this, and thus sets out to surprise her by 'bringing the woods to her'. Nature Cat and friends creatively recreates the woods in Sadie's local playground. "Small But Big" – Squeeks enters the 'small but big art fair', celebrating the 'tiny things of nature'. She leaves Nature Cat and the rest to go to the art show, providing them directions. They use their orientation and co-ordination skills to navigate to the art show, observing the microscopic life of nature along the way.
21	21	"Slime Time"	July 11, 2016	NCAT-000121
21	21	"Rock Stars"	July 11, 2016	NCAT-000121
"Slime Time" – While the rest observe snails in fascination, Nature Cat is more concerned of his suspicion that Ronald stole his yarn ball. To retrieve the yarn, Nature Cat and the rest go into his yard while Ronald is absent, incidentally finding slugs. Nature Cat becomes interested in slime, scheming a prank against Ronald. "Rock Stars" – Squeeks loses a rock of sentimental value, which she also intended to contend as 'rock start of the month' at a rock collection club. Squeeks and rest goes searching for the rock, along the way the group learns about, finds and collect various other rocks.
22	22	"Gimme Shelter"	July 12, 2016	NCAT-000122
22	22	"Goin' Batty"	July 12, 2016	NCAT-000122
"Gimme Shelter" – During a hike, Squeeks realises an oncoming change of weather, anticipating rain. This causes Nature Cat to panic, as they are too far to return home. In search of a canopied area, Squeeks and the rest suggests building shelter, learning the requirements and techniques of building a watertight shelter. "Goin' Batty” – Nature Cat and friends are going on a hiking trip to 'Cocono Cave'. Nature Cat's impatience makes him negligent to Daisy's advice on keeping safe and well prepared for long term ventures into Nature. Nature Cat faces various dangers, like being bitten by mosquitoes, sprayed by a skunk and infected by poison ivy. When Nature Cat is stung by a bee, Nature Cat resigns from the adventure feeling his feline instincts were unpremeditated. After leaving his friends behind and intending to be Fred the Yellow Cat to show that it's the end of Nature Cat, he soon learns the importance of risk awareness and safe planning in nature.
23	23	"The Legend of Gold Gardens"	July 13, 2016	NCAT-000123
23	23	"Winter Dance Party"	July 13, 2016	NCAT-000123
"The Legend of Gold Gardens" – The group discovers a map with directions to the fabled Gold Gardens. Ronald joins them, but unbeknownst to them, he intends on taking all the 'gold' for himself; in spite of this, he proves to be too physically unfit to reach the Gold Gardens, which the group attempts to remedy by getting him to exercise. This demonstrated the importance of physical well being when in Nature. "Winter Dance Party" – Every year on the day of the winter solstice, Daisy's Granny Bunny celebrates with a winter dance party. Daisy has been caught unprepared for the occasion, however, and must hurry to get everything set up before she arrives with the help of her friends.
24	24	"Ice is Nice"	July 14, 2016	NCAT-000124
24	24	"Bird's Eye View"	July 14, 2016	NCAT-000124
"Ice is Nice" – During a day of skating at the frozen lake, Nature Cat meets Ronald intruding their skating routine. Nature Cat and Ronald carried hot cocoa in their favorite mugs. Both find it's too hot for them to sip, they put them aside to cool. Nature Cat is horrified to find his favorite hot cocoa mug 'Bug Mug' broke to pieces, and accuses Ronald of breaking it. However, Ronald's also turns out to have broke in a similar manner. The gang sets off to find out who broke the mugs. "Bird's Eye View" – When Hal dreams about flying as a bird does, he becomes curious as what it must be like to live in the sky. This inspires him and his friends to build a tree house and discover what goes on way up high.
25	25	"Runaway Pumpkin"	October 10, 2016	NCAT-000128
25	25	"Lady Bug Tough"	October 10, 2016	NCAT-000128
"Runaway Pumpkin" – On the day of the big Halloween party, Daisy accidentally lets loose her entry for the biggest pumpkin contest. The gang sets out to save it before it gets lost for good. "Lady Bug Tough" – Daisy is horrified to find her roses to be infested with holes on the leaves. When the gang finds out they are suffering from aphids, they soon learn ladybugs are the solution to their problem, and subsequently discover their methods for survival.
26	26	"Stop That Squirrel"	January 2, 2017	NCAT-000125
26	26	"Onward and Pondward"	January 2, 2017	NCAT-000125
"Stop That Squirrel" – Nature Cat and the rest are organising a backyard bird watching activity. The squirrel, 'Cruiser', threatens to steal the bird food they've placed out, and successfully does so. Nature Cat places the food around various obstacles to deter the squirrel from stealing, but the squirrel repeatedly succeeds. "Onward and Pondward" – Nature Cat and the rest visit the pond. They catch a duckling leaving the pond, the duckling justifies this decision by admitting a fear of water. Nature Cat and the rest promises to help the duckling overcome the fear, initially co-exploring the ponds surface life from a raft.
27	27	"Appily Ever After"	January 3, 2017	NCAT-000126
27	27	"Sound Off"	January 3, 2017	NCAT-000126
"Appily Ever After" – Nature Cat and the rest enact the history of an apple orchard, tell the version of Johnny Appleseed, exploring the life cycle of pollination and growth of apply trees. "Sound-Off" – Daisy reports hearing an unusual sound while Nature Cat and the rest are building a sandcastles. While not audible to them or the viewer, they aid Daisy in tracing the origin of the sound. They discover that in the lake fishes report hearing such a sound, disrupting their ecology.
28	28	"The Shell Game"	January 4, 2017	NCAT-000129
28	28	"Heron Food Blues"	January 4, 2017	NCAT-000129
"The Shell Game" — Herbert the Hermit Crab needs to find a shell so he can play in the volleyball championship. "Heron Food Blues" — Nature Cat and pals try to find fish for Flo the Heron.
29	29	"Spring Hunter 3000"	April 10, 2017	NCAT-000127
29	29	"The Case of the Missing Moon"	April 10, 2017	NCAT-000127
"Spring Hunter 3000" – Now that Spring is here, it's time for Daisy's favorite online game: Spring Hunter 3000. The goal of the game is to try and find as many signs of spring as possible, like birds, flowers, or fox kits. The more you find, the more points you get. But in her quest to become the "Queen of Spring," Daisy's obsession with the game threatens to impede her enjoyment of Spring's wonders. "The Case of the Missing Moon" – Hal is depressed. When he went to howl at the Moon, like he does every night, the Moon was gone. Can Nature Cat and his pals find the missing Moon, or will Hal's nightly howls come to an end for good?
30	30	"Mighty Mountain Climbers"	April 11, 2017	NCAT-000130
30	30	"Bug Eating Plants!"	April 11, 2017	NCAT-000130
"Mighty Mountain Climbers" – Nature Cat loses a kite, he climbs a tree to retrieve it. Ronald insists that Nature Cat's climbing skills are no match to his own, prompting him to claim that he has climbed the 'Mighty Mountain Peak'. Rebuffed, Nature Cat embarks the mountain with his friends, learning the additional hiking, training and nature skills required. "Bug Eating Plants" – Squeeks tells the story of 'the bug eating plants', enrapturing her friends into her fantasy world where they are miniature characters navigating through a swamp, persistently wary of plants that eat 'bug sized critters', but Hal is absent minded to these dangers and is continuously warned whenever he endangers himself, learning of different carnivorous plants along the way.
31	31	"Flight of the Firefly"	April 12, 2017	NCAT-000134
31	31	"Thunderstruck"	April 12, 2017	NCAT-000134
"Flight of the Firefly" – Hal is attempting to capture fireflies, eventually capturing one firefly who he names 'George'. Daisy and the rest insist that Hal releases George, Hal complies. They learn that George is looking for a mating festival, and along the way they learn about how fireflies communicate and their ecosystem. "Thunderstruck" – Nature Cat and the rest are outdoors collecting items of nature for a nature scrapbook. However, clouds roll in and Daisy anticipates a thunderstorm. They retreat into Hal's newly carpeted dog house for safety, consequently learning how the physics of thunderstorms is analogous to the static electricity gathered from Hal's carpets, and other facts about thunder.
32	32	"Plants Got the Moves"	April 13, 2017	NCAT-000135
32	32	"Magnet Mania"	April 13, 2017	NCAT-000135
"Plants Got the Moves" – Daisy prepares germinating bean seeds to compete in the 'animal science fair', but loses it by a gust of wind. After Daisy leans on a plant whose leaves contracts on contact, they hypothesise if other plants do this, learning other plants can track the sun and grow away from gravity. "Magnet Mania" – Squeeks assorts various activities for Magnet Mania Day. Nature Cat finds a magnetic rock of iron, and subsequently comes across an individual who claims there's a large magnetic rock 'Old Lucky' far North. They head North, eventually learning how magnets can be used as a compass.
33	33	"Return to Mighty Mountain"	April 14, 2017	NCAT-000138
33	33	"Welcome to the Vernal Pond"	April 14, 2017	NCAT-000138
"Return to Mighty Mountain" – Nature Cat and the rest returns to the 'Mighty Mountain' along with Ronald, under the guide of Daisy's grandmother Granny Bunny. Nature Cat is trepidatious about camping, but Ronald insists he is not. They learn about the safety and co-ordination required to enjoy mountainous nature and camping. "Welcome to the Vernal Pond" – Nature Cat and the rest come across a Salamander, learning she intends to lay eggs in a pond in the forest. Nature Cat is skeptical of the existence of this pond, and so is led by the Salamander to it. They learn that the pond seasonally appears in Spring, and the cycle of vernal creatures over a number of months.
34	34	"The Queen of the Night"	September 11, 2017	NCAT-000131
34	34	"Space Rocks"	September 11, 2017	NCAT-000131
"The Queen of the Night" - Tonight is the one night a year that the Queen of the Night cactus blooms but the flower only lasts for a few hours. Daisy has always wanted to go to the desert to see it. But to find the flower in the great big desert - and in time - Nature Cat and the gang are sure going to need some help from new friends. "Space Rocks" - Nature Cat and his pals are on a top-secret, extremely important mission to find a real space rock for Squeeks' rock collection. Finding a real space rock isn't the easiest thing in the world to do, in fact it's very hard, but that doesn't deter Nature Cat and the gang from looking all over the four corners of their neighborhood.
35	35	"Croak and Swagger"	September 12, 2017	NCAT-000132
35	35	"Puddle Pool Party"	September 12, 2017	NCAT-000132
"Croak and Swagger" - Nature Cat leads his friends to the pond for a day of listening to one of the most amazing spring sounds: the bullfrog croak. At the pond, amid the bullfrog croaks, the gang hears another sound: someone crying. Nature Cat finds the cries coming from Warren the Bullfrog, who is very sad because he doesn't know how to croak. It's up to Nature Cat and his pals to help Warren get his croak back. "Puddle Pool Party" - Squeeks is so excited because today she has invited her pals to a puddle in the woods for a Puddle Pool Party. Arriving in the woods with their bathing suits on and pool toys at the ready, the gang finds a big problem, the puddle is gone! Everyone including, Squeeks, are disappointed. How can they cheer up?
36	36	"The Glow Games"	September 13, 2017	NCAT-000133
36	36	"Have a Grape Day"	September 13, 2017	NCAT-000133
"The Glow Games" - Ronald challenges Nature Cat and his friends to compete in the Glow Games. The first team to find three bioluminescent creatures wins the game as well as the Golden Glow Trophy. "Have a Grape Day" - Led by Squeeks, the gang is on their way to the grape patch because today the grapes will finally be ripe and ready to eat. Squeeks can't wait for grape tacos, grape fricassee, grape suzette, grape flambe. But all their excitement comes screeching to a halt when the gang sees the sight before them: the whole grape patch has been overtaken by weeds everywhere. That's when they discover that Ronald is replacing the grape patch with terrible-tasting berries. Will Nature Cat find a solution to restore the grapes?
37	37	"Flamingo-a-Go-Go"	September 14, 2017	NCAT-000136
37	37	"What a Tangled Web"	September 14, 2017	NCAT-000136
"Flamingo-a-Go-Go" - While playing a game of nature I-spy, Squeeks spies something... pink? Upon a closer look, the gang finds the source of the pink color, Lola, a flamingo who lost her flock while they were on their way to a new home. Lola doesn't remember where their new home was going to be. It's up to Nature Cat and his pals to find Lola's new home, while learning a little bit about flamingos along the way. "What a Tangled Web" - Nature Cat is really sad, it seems that someone has been taking all his cat toys, most recently Mr. Silly Sock. How can they find out who the cat toy thief is? Daisy gets an idea to catch the thief, inspired by Wanda the spider who has a web in Daisy's garden.
38	38	"The Shellersons"	September 15, 2017	NCAT-000137
38	38	"Only the Shadow Knows"	September 15, 2017	NCAT-000137
"The Shellersons" - On a trip to Barrel Cactus National Park to enjoy nature in all its glorious splendor, Nature Cat and his pals encounter Shelby, a very sad desert tortoise. Today is Shelby's Shellerson Family Reunion party, but none of the other Shellerson members have shown up. Nature Cat vows to help Shelby and find his family members, "The Shellerson Family Reunion will go on." "Only the Shadow Knows" - As Daisy, Hal and Squeeks are having a blast making shadow puppets, Nature Cat is just sitting in a tree, watching and waiting, waiting and watching. For what? It seems that yesterday, Norman the Squirrel appeared in the same tree Nature Cat sits in now, took a look at the ground, and said that if Nature Cat wants to see something "unbelievably incredibly amazingly Nature Cat-y" he has to be in the same spot at the same time tomorrow. Nature Cat isn't moving until he sees something "unbelievably incredibly amazingly Nature Cat-y."

=== Season 2 (2018–19) ===
No. overall	No. in season	Title	Original release date	Prod. code
39	1	"Moth Frolic-Fest"	January 1, 2018	NCAT-000201
39	1	"Dune Patrol"	January 1, 2018	NCAT-000201
"Moth Frolic Fest": Hal misses the Butterfly Frolic Fest, and so decides to frolic with moths instead. "Dune Patrol": How can Nature Cat and his gang protect the dunes when Ronald keeps bothering them?
40	2	"Stop and Hear the Cicadas"	January 2, 2018	NCAT-000202
40	2	"Cold-Blooded"	January 2, 2018	NCAT-000202
"Stop and Hear the Cicadas": Nature Cat learns about cicadas. "Cold-Blooded": Who is knocking over Daisy's homemade pinecone toys?
41	3	"Lights Out for Sea Turtles"	January 3, 2018	NCAT-000203
41	3	"Nature Art"	January 3, 2018	NCAT-000203
"Lights Out for Sea Turtles": The newborn turtles have gone to the neighborhood instead of the ocean, and Nature Cat and his friends have to bring them back to where they belong. "Nature Art": Nature Cat can't think of something for Nature Art day.
42	4	"Houston's Outdoor Adventure"	January 4, 2018	NCAT-000204
42	4	"Hotel Hal"	January 4, 2018	NCAT-000204
"Houston's Outdoor Adventure": Houston has never been on a Nature Adventure. "Hotel Hal": Hal leads a bunch of voles into his dog house.
43	5	"Let's Talk Turkey Vulture"	April 23, 2018	NCAT-000205
43	5	"Prescription: Nature"	April 23, 2018	NCAT-000205
"Let's Talk Turkey Vulture": Nature Cat and the gang meet two turkey vultures and learn about scavenge. "Prescription: Nature": Hal has to go outside when he gets frustrated while building his Squeak-a-Saurus Rex.
44	6	"Enter the Dragonfly"	April 24, 2018	NCAT-000206
44	6	"Water Woes"	April 24, 2018	NCAT-000206
"Enter the Dragonfly": Ronald learns about dragonflies in order to get a helmet for the Knights of Nature. "Water Woes": With Daisy's plants all droopy because of a drought, she and the others learn to conserve water.
45	7	"Garden Impossible"	April 25, 2018	NCAT-000207
45	7	"Agents of the Great Outdoors"	April 25, 2018	NCAT-000207
"Garden Impossible": Daisy's friend Petunia needs some help making a city garden because she doesn't know how to build one. "Agents of the Great Outdoors": Nature Cat and his friends are super spies undercover to discover if animals can communicate.
46	8	"Bunyan Trouble"	November 12, 2018	NCAT-000209
46	8	"Foggy Feat"	November 12, 2018	NCAT-000209
"Bunyan Trouble": Squeeks tells a story about how Nature Cat and the gang (as the Tree Scouts) prevented Little Paulie Bunyan Jr. from cutting the redwood trees down. "Foggy Feat": Nature Cat and the others go to see a spring sunrise for Granny Bunny, but a fog blocks the path. NOTE: Starting with this episode onward, a new segment called Nature Prize Surprise comes after the "real animals" notice, which replaces the live action kids sponsor segment.
47	9	"Rights or Wrong"	November 13, 2018	NCAT-000210
47	9	"Amazing Animals"	November 13, 2018	NCAT-000210
"Rights or Wrong": Returning to the marsh, Nature Cat and his pals teach Ronald the importance of nature's rights. "Amazing Animals": Nature Cat and his pals venture through the wintry forest to Granny Bunny's surprise, learning about the features of winter's animals along the way. Fun fact: It serves as the 100th overall episode.
48	10	"Backyard Bigfoot"	November 14, 2018	NCAT-000211
48	10	"Imperfect Produce"	November 14, 2018	NCAT-000211
"Backyard Bigfoot": Squeeks believes that a "bigfoot" might be ruining her backyard campout party. "Imperfect Produce": Everyone thinks Squeeks' bumped up carrots still tasted good on the day of the "Fall Festival and Crop Competition".
49	11	"Man-Oh-Mangrove"	November 15, 2018	NCAT-000212
49	11	"Northern Lights Sights"	November 15, 2018	NCAT-000212
"Man-Oh-Mangrove": Nature Cat and the gang explore a mangrove forest to help a lost spiny lobster find its home, but can't seem to find the right one. "Northern Lights Sights": Nature Cat and his pals struggle to find the Aurora Borealis as part of his Nature Curiosity List.
50	12	"A Prickly Problem"	November 16, 2018	NCAT-000213
50	12	"A Shedtime Story"	November 16, 2018	NCAT-000213
"A Prickly Problem": Nature Cat and the gang meet a porcupine. "A Shedtime Story": Nature Cat fears his friends and other animals have the furry flu, but he learns that fur keeps animals warm.
51	13	"The Big Bath Brouhaha"	February 18, 2019	NCAT-000208
51	13	"Fossil Hunt"	February 18, 2019	NCAT-000208
"The Big Bath Brouhaha": When Hal gets dirty before a picture for Granny Bunny's birthday, the rest taught him about how some animals can bathe themselves. "Fossil Hunt": Nature Cat and his pals must find a fossil for Squeeks' "Mousey Scouts" fossil badge.
52	14	"Daisy's Wildflower Round-Up"	February 19, 2019	NCAT-000214
52	14	"A Party for Squeeks"	February 19, 2019	NCAT-000214
"Daisy's Wildflower Round-Up": Daisy and the others play cowboys, going on an adventure to find three wildflowers. "A Party for Squeeks": Squeeks suffers the winter blues, so Nature Cat, Daisy, and Hal proceed to hold an "end of winter party", inviting several of her friends while getting ready.
53	15	"Are You My Egg?"	February 20, 2019	NCAT-000215
53	15	"SOS (Save Our Salad)"	February 20, 2019	NCAT-000215
"Are You My Egg?": Nature Cat and his pals set out to find a nest for a lost lizard. "S.O.S (Save Our Salad)": Nature Cat and the gang try to think of solutions after his garden is taken over by Japanese beetles.
54	16	"Snow Way to Keep Warm"	February 21, 2019	NCAT-000216
54	16	"So You Think You Know Nature?"	February 21, 2019	NCAT-000216
"Snow Way to Keep Warm": Nature Cat and the gang must save Hal's chew toy Mr. Chewinsky once again, this time under the snow. "So You Think You Know Nature?": When Nature Cat and his pals end up in a nature themed game show, he feels that he doesn't know much about mimicking in nature.
55	17	"The Deal with Eels"	February 22, 2019	NCAT-000217
55	17	"Skip It"	February 22, 2019	NCAT-000217
"The Deal with Eels": Nature Cat leads his pals to follow an eel on its long journey to Sargasso Sea. "Skip It": Through some persistence and courage, Nature Cat learns how to skip rocks while competing against Ronald for the "Rock Skipping Championship".
56	18	"Wild Batts!"	April 15, 2019	NCAT-000218
56	18	"No Bird Left Behind!"	April 15, 2019	NCAT-000218
"Wild Batts": Chris and Martin Kratt show up as Chris and Martin Batt as two wild bat brothers whose tree home is destroyed, forcing them to find a new shelter. Nature Cat and his pals who come to the rescue, helping Chris and Martin Batt by building them their brand new home (with help of Granny Bunny). "Note": This episode is a parody of Wild Kratts. "No Bird Left Behind": Nature Cat and the gang endure on a high-flying airplane journey to get a Baltimore oriole to Honduras when he injured his wing.
57	19	"Soil Turmoil"	April 16, 2019	NCAT-000219
57	19	"Wisteria Hysteria"	April 16, 2019	NCAT-000219
"Soil Turmoil": The gang's vole friend Steve is upset because Ronald stole his burrow. "Wisteria Hysteria": On her way to deliver some jumbo carrot muffins to Granny Bunny, Daisy and the others have to discover (along with a sad wolf) who is throwing seeds at them!
58	20	"Nature Cat's Nature Stories"	April 17, 2019	NCAT-000220
58	20	"Pattern Problema"	April 17, 2019	NCAT-000220
"Nature Cat's Nature Stories": Daisy has trouble trying to make up a silly nature story. "Pattern Problema": Hal needs some help to finish decorating his doghouse for his mom.

=== Season 3 (2019–21) ===
This is the last season that was animated by 9 Story.

No. overall	No. in season	Title	Original release date	Prod. code
59	1	"Animal Rescue Crew"	April 18, 2019	NCAT-000301
59	1	"Nature of Dreams"	April 18, 2019	NCAT-000301
"Animal Rescue Crew": Nature Cat and his pals find an injured baby fox while playing Wild Animal Rescue. "Nature of Dreams": Hal has a plan to bring nature to Sadie after she hurts her paw and has to stay home. NOTE: In this episode, the "Not real animals" notice is not seen, and skips to the Nature Prize Surprise segment.
60	2	"Freezin' in the Summer Season"	April 19, 2019	NCAT-000302
60	2	"Total Eclipse of the Sun"	April 19, 2019	NCAT-000302
"Freezin' in the Summer Season": Dark clouds threaten Nature Cat's annual Summer Fest, which includes the Summer Fest Sprinkler Frolic, a bike ride and a kickball game. "Total Eclipse of the Sun": Hal is afraid of the total eclipse of the Sun.
61	3	"Onward and Song-ward"	July 8, 2019	NCAT-000303
61	3	"Why Did the Turtle Cross the Road?"	July 8, 2019	NCAT-000303
"Onward and Song-ward": In this musical story, the Woodstock Chella Palooza is approaching as Daisy tries to think of a song but doesn't know how it goes. "Why Did the Turtle Cross the Road?": The gang is enjoying an afternoon with Granny Bunny in the pond when they notice turtles getting blocked by speeding cars while strolling.
62	4	"Secrets of the Old Prairie"	July 9, 2019	NCAT-000304
62	4	"A Sticky Sweet Tree Treat"	July 9, 2019	NCAT-000304
"Secrets of the Old Prairie": The Agents of the Great Outdoors are on another mission to find six secrets in a national park. "A Sticky Sweet Tree Treat": It takes patience for Nature Cat and his pals to learn the process from sap to syrup.
63	5	"Amber Rocks!"	July 10, 2019	NCAT-000310
63	5	"The Big Stink"	July 10, 2019	NCAT-000310
"Amber Rocks!": Daisy finds a piece of amber on the beach. "The Big Stink": While the gang prepares for Nature Cat's family reunion picnic, a huge stench takes over the yard.
64	6	"Magical Mushroom Mystery Tour"	July 11, 2019	NCAT-000311
64	6	"A Midsummer Day's Dream"	July 11, 2019	NCAT-000311
"Magical Mushroom Mystery Tour": Squeeks and the rest learn about different types of mushrooms. "A Midsummer Day's Dream": Ronald gets bored of the Midsummer festivities and dreams about the day's celebration.
65	7	"Great Salt Lake"	May 11, 2020	NCAT-000305
65	7	"The Praying Mantis Hunters"	May 11, 2020	NCAT-000305
"Great Salt Lake": Nature Cat and the others must cross the Great Salt Lake in order to see the Colossal Cat Monument. "The Praying Mantis Hunters": Daisy is making a movie about bugs, but the most important one she and the others are searching for is a praying mantis.
66	8	"Tally Ho, A Volcano"	May 12, 2020	NCAT-000306
66	8	"No Rest for the Squeeky"	May 12, 2020	NCAT-000306
"Tally Ho, A Volcano!": Steve takes the gang on a journey to explore extinct and active volcanoes. "No Rest for the Squeeky": Squeeks decides to stay up all night and tries to prove to the others that not all animals sleep.
67	9	"Niagara Falls"	May 13, 2020	NCAT-000307
67	9	"Nature Plant"	May 13, 2020	NCAT-000307
"Niagara Falls": The gang and Houston set out on a trip to Niagara Falls for Nature Cat's curiosity list. "Nature Plant": When Nature Cat gets increasingly tired while playing one day, he dozes off and has a dream about being a plant.
68	10	"The Grand Mystery of the Grand Canyon"	May 14, 2020	NCAT-000308
68	10	"Strongest Show on Earth"	May 14, 2020	NCAT-000308
"The Grand Mystery of the Grand Canyon": Nature Cat and his pals are in the Grand Canyon where they discover how it was formed. "Strongest Show on Earth": Nature Cat and the others meet with a traveling troupe who hold a contest to find the strongest animal.
69	11	"Under Pressure"	May 15, 2020	NCAT-000309
69	11	"Rainy Day"	May 15, 2020	NCAT-000309
"Under Pressure": The group, Ronald, and Grampy Donald visit Yellowstone to see the geysers. "Rainy Day": Nature Cat and his friends head outside to learn how some animals deal with rain.
70	12	"Sweet Symbiosis"	June 4, 2021	NCAT-000312
70	12	"Strawberry Fields Forever"	June 4, 2021	NCAT-000312
"Sweet Symbiosis": On a trip to the tide pool, Nature Cat and his pals meet a hermit crab named Bridget who is scared of an octopus. "Strawberry Fields Forever": It's up to Nature Cat and his friends to think fast to keep the fresh strawberries from getting dried out so they can deliver them to Sadie.
71	13	"More Than a Monkey Wrench"	June 4, 2021	NCAT-000313
71	13	"Trailblazers"	June 4, 2021	NCAT-000313
"More Than a Monkey Wrench": Nature Cat's Norwegian Navy Wrench isn't functioning as planned out during a hike, so his pals taught him about using tools from nature. "Trailblazers": The gang prepares to hike on a new trail that would lead to a special place.
72	14	"Hal the Duck"	June 4, 2021	NCAT-000314
72	14	"The Crow-Lympics"	June 4, 2021	NCAT-000314
"Hal the Duck": When Hal finds a lone bird's egg, he and the others recruit Racer the Rescue Raccoon to find its nest and family. "The Crow-Lympics": In order to prove that he's smarter than birds, Ronald reluctantly decides to compete in the "Crow-Lympics".
73	15	"What a Pearl"	June 4, 2021	NCAT-000315
73	15	"Wild Bee Motel"	June 4, 2021	NCAT-000315
"What a Pearl": Nature Cat and the others create the Happiest Hiking Trail for Pearl, a blind dog who is their newest neighbor. "Wild Bee Motel": Petunia needs some help when her green bean plants are un-pollinated due to no bees coming.

=== Season 4 (2022) ===
This is the first season that was animated by Yowza!.

No. overall	No. in season	Title	Original release date	Prod. code
74	1	"Nature Dance Party"	May 9, 2022	NCAT-000401
74	1	"Bad Dog Bart Jr."	May 9, 2022	NCAT-000401
"Nature Dance Party": Everything is all set for Nature Cat's Nature Dance Party except for the music. "Bad Dog Bart Junior": The only way to get Nature Cat's new cat toy back is to follow a new treasure map devised by Bad Dog Bart's daughter, Bad Dog Bart Junior.
75	2	"Rock Clues"	May 10, 2022	NCAT-000402
75	2	"Sweet Scent"	May 10, 2022	NCAT-000402
"Rock Clues": Squeeks' magnifying glass for the Rock Stars Club goes missing. "Sweet Scent": The gang tracks down a huge sweet scent.
76	3	"The Leaf Fairy"	May 11, 2022	NCAT-000404
76	3	"Midge Over Troubled Water"	May 11, 2022	NCAT-000404
"The Leaf Fairy": Hal wants to find a Leaf Fairy to prevent autumn leaves from falling. "Midge Over Troubled Water": Nature Cat tries to prevent a cloud of midges from pestering his waterskiing stunts.
77	4	"The Nature Nap Dilemma" "The Nature Nap Dilemma"	May 12, 2022	NCAT-000405
77	4	"Captain Nature Cat's Wild River Adventure" "Wild River Adventure"	May 12, 2022	NCAT-000405
"The Nature Nap Dilemma": The gang learns about dams while trying to find a place for a nap. "Captain Nature Cat's Wild River Adventure": The gang embark on a raft journey to return an oyster named Elroy to his estuary on the wild river.
78	5	"Agents of the Great Outdoors: City and True Love Edition"	June 16, 2022	NCAT-000403
78	5	"The Nature-tastic Four"	June 16, 2022	NCAT-000403
"Agents of the Great Outdoors: City and True Love Edition": The gang sets out to the city to deliver a letter to a possum's wife. "The Nature-tastic Four": Houston becomes a villain and the gang has to prevent him from capturing the sun.
79	6	"The Petrified Wood Mystery"	September 19, 2022	NCAT-000406
79	6	"Nature Buddy Clubhouse"	September 19, 2022	NCAT-000406
"The Petrified Wood Mystery": Daisy and her pals travel back in time to learn about petrified wood with an old woodchuck named Jeremiah. "Nature Buddy Clubhouse": The gang gathers some supplies to build their own clubhouse.
80	7	"The Moss Queen" "Moss Mouse"	September 20, 2022	NCAT-000407
80	7	"Leaf Moving Machine Mayhem" "Leaf Moving Machine Mayhem"	September 20, 2022	NCAT-000407
"Moss Mouse": Squeeks proclaims herself queen when she and the others find moss in the forest. "Leaf Moving Machine Mayhem": Nature Cat recounts the story of the past about how he as a kitten and his young friends worked together to prevent Ronald and the pollution of leaf blowers.
81	8	"Daddy Long Legs"	September 21, 2022	NCAT-000408
81	8	"Outerspace Detectives"	September 21, 2022	NCAT-000408
"Daddy Long Legs": Once again, the Agents of the Great Outdoors are on another mission, this time to know a daddy longlegs. "Outerspace Detectives": The gang and Ronald launch themselves into outer space when they believe that a monster has eaten half of the moon.
82	9	"Saving Seeds"	September 22, 2022	NCAT-000409
82	9	"Onward and Mossward"	September 22, 2022	NCAT-000409
"Saving Seeds": The group tries to find ways to enjoy their favorite sunflower when the growing season ends. "Onward and Mossward": Nature Cat and his pals learn about where moss can grow when they get lost and an eagle steals their map.
83	10	"Outdoor Nature Warrior"	September 23, 2022	NCAT-000410
83	10	"Hide and Go Screech"	September 23, 2022	NCAT-000410
"Outdoor Nature Warrior": The gang keeps themselves cool to pass the Outdoor Nature Warrior challenge. "Hide and Go Screech": A new friend, a screech owl named Screechy, joins the gang for a great game of hide and seek.

=== Season 5 (2023–24) ===
No. overall	No. in season	Title	Original release date	Prod. code
84	1	"The Legend of Cowboy Kitty"	April 17, 2023	NCAT-000501
84	1	"The Corn Conundrum"	April 17, 2023	NCAT-000501
"The Legend of Cowboy Kitty": Quentin Bearantino's newest Western movie with Nature Cat in the lead role is in need of a cactus for the desert background. "The Corn Conundrum": Nature Cat and his pals visit Hugo's farm to revive a dry cornfield.
85	2	"Window Worries"	April 18, 2023	NCAT-000502
85	2	"The Pinecone Genie"	April 18, 2023	NCAT-000502
"Window Worries": The gang helps Brooks fly safe and free when he accidentally lands on Sadie's window. "The Pinecone Genie": Things get chaotic when wolves are wished out of existence by the gang in Mystic Pinecone Park.
86	3	"The Parade of Pets"	April 19, 2023	NCAT-000503
86	3	"Hal's Pals"	April 19, 2023	NCAT-000503
"Parade of Pets": While organizing a parade, Nature Cat finds a way with his pals to improvise in pulling the floats. "Hal's Pals": The gang is on the case to discover what happened to Hal's pond pals, but Nature Cat prefers to play ice hockey.
87	4	"Living on the Edge"	April 20, 2023	NCAT-000504
87	4	"Wild World of Wild Play in the Wild"	April 20, 2023	NCAT-000504
"Living on the Edge": The Lawn Bowling Championship is about to get underway when the gang notices an edge habitat that needs to get fixed. "Wild World of Wild Play in the Wild": Searching for predators, Squeeks wants to know how animals in the wild engage in play.
88	5	"Know Your Snow"	July 3, 2023	NCAT-000505
88	5	"The Nature-tastic Four and the Humongous Hurricane"	July 3, 2023	NCAT-000505
"Know Your Snow": Nature Cat gets yet another challenge from MC Ferret, this time to build the world's tallest snow critter and to win a winter quiz contest with Ronald first. "Nature-tastic Four and the Humongous Hurricane": Squeeks tells another story about how the Nature-tastic Four help protect themselves and Ronald from a hurricane.
89	6	"The Bumblebee Queen"	July 4, 2023	NCAT-000506
89	6	"Tree Love"	July 4, 2023	NCAT-000506
"The Bumblebee Queen": The gang dons bumblebee costumes and helps the Bumblebee Queen grow a garden. "Tree Love": The gang visits the Mighty Oak Tree and with help from their new friend Shell Brooks, they discover more about oak trees with a tall tale about how it was planted.
90	7	"Dr. Pumpkinstein"	October 19, 2023	NCAT-000507
90	7	"Nature Catfish"	October 19, 2023	NCAT-000507
"Dr. Pumpkinstein": White warty pumpkins have taken over Hugo's farm, hours before the Halloween party. "Nature Catfish": The gang sets out to find (and learn more) about a catfish as part of Nature Cat's Nature Curiosity List.
91	8	"A Little Kelp from My Friends"	October 26, 2023	NCAT-000508
91	8	"Mission to Mars"	October 26, 2023	NCAT-000508
"A Little Kelp From My Friends": As instructed by MC Ferret's "Fab Forest Friend Challenge", the gang goes to a kelp forest to learn its importance when they encounter kelp-eating sea urchins. "Mission to Mars": The gang imagine themselves flying to the planet Mars to prove if there are aliens living there.
92	9	"ATV Adventure"	January 1, 2024	NCAT-000509
92	9	"Nature Buddy Breakup"	January 1, 2024	NCAT-000509
"ATV Adventure": Some ATV riders disrupt the gang's hike to the top of Mighty Mountain. "Nature Buddy Breakup": The gang splits up after an argument, only to learn about the ways of animals living together.
93	10	"Bunny Baby Babysitter"	January 2, 2024	NCAT-000510
93	10	"King of the Backyard Bouncy Castles"	January 2, 2024	NCAT-000510
"Bunny Baby Babysitter": The gang learns about various animals raising their offspring while trying to reunite a fluffle of baby bunnies with their mother. "King of the Backyard Bouncy Castles": After setting up some bouncy castles in the backyard resulting in no room for deer, Nature Cat and his friends learn about deer wildlife corridors.

== Specials (2017–25) ==
Unlike the series' typical 11-minute formatted segments, these episodes are nearly an hour long, and aren't considered part of the series' official ordering by PBS.

No.	Title	Original release date	Prod. code
1	"Ocean Commotion"	June 19, 2017	TBA
When Hal's favorite squeaky toy Mr. Chewinsky gets lost from the dog and toy anniversary party, Nature Cat and the rest of his team find reinforcements, in Nature Dog and Houston's cousin Sputnik from Russia, to retrieve him and remove trash from the ocean along the way to save it and its inhabitants. Note: PBS first aired this special as two separate episodes, "Ocean Commotion, Part 1" (NCAT-000139), and "Ocean Commotion, Part 2" (NCAT-000140); however, they are now taken out of the normal rotation of episodes.
2	"The Return of Bad Dog Bart!"	July 16, 2018	TBA
Nature Cat, having realized his and other cats' favorite toys have gone missing, goes on a mission to retrieve them from Bad Dog Bart. Along the way, they meet a tough pirate named One Eared Winnie, who is also trying to find the treasure. Fortunately, One Eared Winnie later turns out to be Nature Cat's long-lost sister, Gwendolyn, who he reunites with.
3	"A Nature Carol"	November 29, 2019	NCAT-000333
In the tradition of the Dickens holiday classic, Nature Cat is bursting with what he thinks is "Christmas spirit", wanting to celebrate with many presents for himself and decorating the woods with bright lights and loud festive music. His pals get upset because his hype and big plans are causing problems with their friendship and the other animals. It's not until Nature Cat is visited by the spirits of Nature Past (Daisy), Present (Squeeks) and Future (Hal) on Christmas Eve that he can find the true meaning of Christmastime.
4	"Nature Cat's Nature Movie Special Extraordinaire"	April 22, 2024	TBA
Nature Cat and his pals realize they've come to the end of their Nature Curiosity List. Meanwhile, Sir Galahad gives himself the title of king, moves into a barren castle and steals pieces of nature to make his castle look more beautiful.
5	"The Nature-Tastic Four Movie"	April 3, 2025	TBA
Nature Cat doubts himself of not having powers as his friends do while the Nature-Tastic Four all feel ready for a well-earned afternoon of fun and relaxation after defeating the Soil, Water and Plant Stealers. But when Water Mouse (Squeeks), Plant Bunny (Daisy), and Rock Dog (Hal) get their powers lost and stolen by an outer space creature named Sandos and nature needs defending, it's up to Nature Cat to get over his confused and self-doubting issues and gain the courage to discover what it takes to be a real hero in nature.
