= Bedbugs (musical) =

2014 American musical comedy

Bedbugs!!!
- it's a musical
- 2014 off-Broadway production official art
- Music: Paul Leschen
- Lyrics: Fred Sauter
- Book: Fred Sauter
- Productions: 2014 Off-Broadway

Bedbugs!!! is an American musical comedy about a mad-scientist exterminator named Carly who accidentally mutates New York City's bed bug population with her super-insecticide, which she created out of revenge for her mother's bedbug-related death. The rock musical, written by Paul Leschen (Music) and Fred Sauter (Book and Lyrics), pays homage to 80s rock music, 80s films such as Gremlins and Ghostbusters, and features a side-plot about a Canadian pop singer called Dionne Salon (based on Celine Dion). It opened off-Broadway at the Arclight Theatre on September 14, 2014 and closed on November 2, 2014. It has been compared to The Rocky Horror Show and Little Shop of Horrors.

== Themes ==
The show deals with environmental themes, including a song called "Silent Spring", relating to the famous 1962 book by scientist/activist Rachel Carson. The main character Carly's war on the bedbug population was initially inspired by George W. Bush's war on terror.

== History ==
Bedbugs!!! first played in the New York Musical Theater Festival (NYMF) in 2008, starring Lena Hall as Carly, Brian Charles Rooney as Dionne Salon and Chris Hall as Cimex. The production was directed by Samuel Buggeln.

A workshop of Bedbugs!!! ran during Hurricane Sandy in October 2012 at the ATA Chernuchin Theater, also with Mr. Hall and Mr. Rooney.

Off-Broadway, Bedbugs!!! ran from September 14 to November 2, 2014. The production (as well as the 2012 workshop) was directed and choreographed by Robert Bartley and produced by Dale Joan Young. It starred Grace McLean, Chris Hall, Brian Charles Rooney and Danny Bolero. The costumes were by Philip Heckman. Like in the 2012 workshop, the set, props and costumes were created largely from used materials, bedding and garbage, inspired by the fact that actual bed bugs can be easily spread when accidentally brought into apartments via used furniture and used beds.

== Critical reception ==
Bedbugs!!! was critically praised in its 2014 Off-Broadway run and was both a New York Times and Time Out New York Critic's Pick. Neil Genzlinger of The New York Times called it "A theatrical blast of fresh air" and wrote, "Bedbugs!!! is an audacious rock-'n'-roll concoction that never stops surprising... The sci-fi slapstick tradition of Little Shop of Horrors and The Rocky Horror Show is alive and well and now, six-legged." Adam Feldman of Time Out New York wrote, "If you like musicals that earn their exclamation points, this may be what you’ve been itching for."
