= Bob Milne =

American ragtime musician

Robert "Bob" Milne is an American ragtime musician and concert pianist. Considered as a "very good specialist of ragtime boogie", he was referred to as a "national treasure" after he was interviewed and documented for future generations by the U.S. Library of Congress in 2004.

Experiments conducted by Penn State neuroscientist Kerstin Bettermann established that Milne has the unusual ability to mentally "play" up to four symphonies in his head simultaneously.

[Reference for keyboardmag.com not currently accurate: needs updating or send to archive.org]

== Discography ==
- Folksongs, Barrelhouse and Ragtime (1993)
- Old Songs & Old Rags - Some Like 'Em Hot! (1997)
- The Robert E. Lee (1997)
- The Green River Blues (2000)
- Boogie, Blues & Rags (2001)
- The Red River Valley (2004)
- I wonder (2007)
- Silent Night (Ragged Night) (2007)
- Sounds of New Orleans (2007)
- The Last Carousel (2014)
- The Midnight Express
