= The New Rags =

American indie rock band

- Origin: New York, New York
- Genres: Indie rock, garage rock, ragtime, pop rock
- Years active: 2004-present
- Labels: Silent Stereo
- Members: Thomas Merrigan; Andrew Pierce

The New Rags are an American indie rock band from New York, New York. The New Rags were founded in 2004.

== History ==
The New Rags released the EP "Take Jennie To Brooklyn" in 2005. The use of the single "Your Room" in an international advertisement led to popularity in Japan. The band released their debut full-length "Gotta Get Out Of Here" in Japan shortly after on the label Art Union and later in the United States.

Their single "Your Room" has been placed in advertisements for Nike and Motorola. Their music has also been featured on the television show Weeds

== Members ==
Current

- Thomas Merrigan - Piano, Vocals
- Andrew Pierce - Drums

== Discography ==
=== Full Lengths ===
- Gotta Get Out Of Here (Silent Stereo Records, 2010)

=== EPs ===
"Take Jennie To Brooklyn" (Silent Stereo Records, 2005)

Singles

Superpower (Silent Stereo Records, 2017)
