= Elite Syncopations (ballet) =

- Choreographer: Kenneth MacMillan
- Music: Scott Joplin
- Based on: Music by Scott Joplin
- Premiere: 7 October 1974; The Royal Opera House
- Original ballet company: The Royal Ballet
- Genre: Neoclassical ballet
- Type: comic ballet

Elite Syncopations is a one-act ballet created in 1974 by Kenneth MacMillan for The Royal Ballet.

== Background and productions ==
The piece was premiered by The Royal Ballet on 7 October 1974 at the Royal Opera House, Covent Garden, with costume designs by Ian Spurling, lighting designs by John B. Read and staging by Julie Lincoln. The ballet is for 12 dancers. It is described as having an up-beat, hip swinging aura of spontaneity, with 'easygoing rhythms'. The band, also 12-strong, sit casually at the back of the stage playing while the dancers perform in front of them, adding to the 1920s party-like atmosphere.

A BBC film of Elite Syncopations was also made in 1975 and danced by The Royal Ballet's original cast, in Battersea's Big Top. The piece entered the repertory of Birmingham Royal Ballet on 10 February 1978 at Sadler's Wells Theatre.

== Music ==
The 'Classic' ragtime composers represented in the production are: Scott Joplin, Scott Hayden, Joseph F. Lamb, James Scott and Robert Hampton. The centrepiece was composed by Scott Joplin. Joplin also wrote a ballet called The Ragtime Dance (performed in 1899) as well as two operas, only one of which survived, called 'Treemonisha' (1902).

MacMillan added some additional ragtime tunes to complete his ballet: Paul Pratt's Hot-house Rag and James Scott's Calliope Rag for piano; Joseph Francis Lamb's Ragtime Nightingale orchestra and Alaskan Rag for piano; Max Morath's The Golden Hours for piano; Donald Ashwander's Friday Night and Robert Hampton's Cataract Rag for orchestra.

The full score list is:

- "Sunflower Slow Drag" (1901) – Scott Joplin (1867/8–1917) with Scott Hayden (1882–1915)
- "Elite Syncopations" (1902) – Scott Joplin
- "The Cascades" (1904) – Scott Joplin, arr. E.J. Stark (1868–1962)
- "Hot–House Rag" (1914) – Paul Pratt (1890–1948)
- "Calliope Rag" (c. 1910; rev. Darch 1964) – James Scott (1885–1938) [and Robert Darch]
- "Ragtime Nightingale" (1914) – Joseph F. Lamb (1877–1960)
- "The Golden Hours" (1966) – Max Morath (b. 1926)
- "Stoptime Rag" (1910) – Scott Joplin
- "The Alaskan Rag" (posthumously published) – Joseph F. Lamb
- "Bethena: a Concert Waltz" (1905) – Scott Joplin
- "Friday Night" (1965) – Donald Ashwander (1929–94)
- "Cataract Rag" (1914) – Robert Hampton (1890–1945)

== Original cast ==
The ballet was premiered in Covent Garden on 7 October 1974: The principal roles were danced by:

- Merle Park – Stop Time Rag
- Donald Macleary
- Monica Mason – Calliope Rag
- Michael Coleman – Friday Night
- Jennifer Penney – The Cascades
- David Wall
- Vergie Derman – Alaskan Rag
- Wayne Sleep – Alaskan Rag
- Wayne Eagling
- Jennifer Jackson
- Judith How
- David Drew
- David Adams

== Reception ==
Initial reception was mixed. The reviewers in The Times and The Observer found the piece vulgar and unstylish, but Dance and Dancers thought it "cheerfully diverting" with "some of the Royal Ballet’s best and most distinctive principals displaying new facets of their artistry in the choreography MacMillan devised for them." When the piece was presented in New York in 1976, The New York Times gave it enthusiastic praise, and it has remained popular with audiences. In 2003 DanceView commented, "Elite's humor is broad and the choreography simple minded. However, the work offered opportunities for dancers to let loose".
