= Edward Berlin =

Edward Berlin may refer to:

- Edward A. Berlin (born 1936), American author and musicologist
- Eddie Berlin (born 1978), American football wide receiver
