= Julius Weiss =

German-American music teacher

Julius Weiss (1840 or 1841 – after 1889) was a German-born American music professor, best known for being the first piano teacher of Scott Joplin, who became known as "the king of ragtime".

Weiss is credited with recognizing Joplin's talent and giving him music and piano lessons as a child, introducing him to European music and models. Weiss emigrated to the US from Germany about 1870 and worked for a time in Port Jervis, New York. In 1877 he settled in Texarkana, Texas, where he worked as a school teacher, tutor and music teacher. He taught Joplin music and other subjects free of cost for several years, beginning when the boy was eleven years old. Joplin's parents, a former slave and a domestic worker, had no way to pay for private lessons. Weiss's later years appear to have been marred by financial scandal.

== Early life and career ==
Weiss was born in Saxony, Germany. He received most of his early education there and attended the University of Saxony. Little was known about Weiss until 60 years after Joplin's death.

He emigrated to the United States about 1870. According to researcher Marcello Piras, by 1874 he settled in Port Jervis, New York, where he taught school and conducted a community choir. He left Port Jervis in 1877, leaving various unpaid debts. The same year, Weiss was hired to privately tutor the children of a wealthy landowner in the lumber industry, Robert W. Rodgers, in Texarkana, Texas. He taught the Rodgers children such subjects as German, astronomy, mathematics, and violin. He also took on other students in town, listing his profession with the town recorder as "Professor of music." Musicologist Edward A. Berlin notes that one of Rodgers' children credited Weiss for having inspired his lifelong appreciation and love of opera.

According to Joplin biographer Rudi Blesh, Weiss, then about age 39, "heard young Joplin play and as a result gave him free lessons in piano, sight reading, and the principles to extend and confirm his natural instinct for harmony." Joplin's parents, a former slave and a domestic worker, had no way to pay for private lessons. Although young Joplin was said to have received some beginner's guidance from local teachers, it was Weiss who first introduced Joplin "to European art music," and the "European masters." Blesh writes that "the professor is said to have played the classics for him, and to have talked of the great composers, and especially of the famous operas." Berlin says that Weiss, through his teaching, had "a profound influence on the young Joplin" and that "the essence of what Weiss accomplished was to impart to Scott an appreciation of music as an art as well as an entertainment. Weiss helped shape Joplin's aspirations and ambitions toward high artistic goals" by introducing him to theories of music composition, European culture, and the benefits of education.

During that time, Joplin's father left his wife and six children. His mother had to take housekeeper jobs for income. To ensure that young Joplin could continue practicing, Weiss found a used piano from another student and helped Joplin's mother buy it. Weiss continued teaching Joplin for five years until about 1884, at no cost, until his employment with the Rodgers family ended. Music historian Theodore Albrecht speculated that, without his father present, the young Joplin "may have found a substitute in his teacher – an 'intellectual parent'". Joplin enrolled in a college of music in his late 20s. Larry Wolz, of The Texas State Historical Association, concludes that "Weiss was surely the inspiration for Joplin's quest to continue his musical education."

== Supposed influence on Treemonisha ==
In 1911, Joplin published one of his most important compositions, the opera Treemonisha. Berlin and other music historians, along with Joplin's widow, have pointed to similarities between the story of Treemonisha and Joplin's own lessons with Weiss. Treemonisha, the protagonist of the opera, is a black teenager who was educated by a white woman, "just as Joplin received his education from a white music teacher". Wolz, in addition, states that the "influence of mid-nineteenth-century German operatic style" is obvious in Treemonisha.

== Later years and scandal ==
Piras identifies Weiss as the same Julius Weiss who, after serving in Texarkana "as a music teacher, then a school keeper", worked as a pawnbroker and jeweler in Texarkana and eventually became president of the Texarkana Savings Bank and a significant stockholder in the H. S. Matthews Lumber Company. In 1889, he left Texarkana, absconding with over $30,000, and fled to Houston, Texas, where he resumed his pawnbroking and jewelry agency, and was also a part-time musician.

According to Albrecht, Joplin's widow said that, in his later years, Joplin kept in touch with Weiss, and upon learning that Weiss was ill and poor, sent him "gifts of money from time to time", until Weiss died. Writing more than 30 years after Albrecht, Piras sheds doubt on this assertion.
