= Seth McCoy =

American opera singer

Seth McCoy (December 17, 1928, Sanford, North Carolina - January 22, 1997, Rochester, New York) was an American operatic tenor.

Among his roles were the American premieres of Tassilone by Agostino Steffani, Káťa Kabanová by Leoš Janáček, and Treemonisha by Scott Joplin. He also sang the part of Marco in the recording of Sergei Rachmaninoff's opera Monna Vanna. This was orchestrated by Igor Buketoff from a piano score by the composer.
