= John Ruhl =

John Ruhl may refer to:

- John Ruhl (physicist) (f. 1980s–2020s)
- John Ruhl (sculptor) (1873–1940), American sculptor
