= Nathan Granner =

American tenor

Nathan Granner is an American tenor who performs in opera and oratorio, as well as more popular genres. He has toured the United States and into Russia and Ireland. He appeared on PBS as a member of Sony Masterworks The American Tenors, a vocal trio created by Frank McNamara. In 2003, their album was No. 5 on Billboard's Crossover Classical Chart.

A 2002 Metropolitan Opera National Semi-Finalist, Granner trained at the University of Missouri–Kansas City Conservatory of Music where he graduated with a degree in vocal performance in 1996. He made his operatic debut in 1998 as Ferrando in the Wolf Trap Opera Company production of Così fan tutte. Other notable performances include Nemorino in L'elisir d'amore at Lyric Opera of Kansas City in 2003, Mr. Owen in Postcard from Morocco, Celestino Medeiros/Lowell in the world premiere of Anton Coppola's opera Sacco and Vanzetti at Opera Tampa (2001), and Remus in the Opera Theatre of Saint Louis production of Scott Joplin's Treemonisha (2000).

== Select Performances ==
In 2002, Granner/Bledsoe performed classical music in a rock club for the first time at The Social in Orlando, FL with Mercy Machine and In 2006, he and classical guitarist, Beau Bledsoe (Granner/Bledsoe), performed a multi-city tour of their show Mozart Was a Punk: How to Make Classical Music Not Suck. The programme draws from many genres, including opera, art song, gospel, flamenco, folk song and Baroque and forms the basis of their 2007 CD, Departure.

In 2005 Nathan Granner was awarded Alumnus of the year from UMKC Conservatory of Music and Dance.

In 2007 Granner/Bledsoe performed in Perm, Russia for the "Diaghilev Seasons Festival."

In 2008 Nathan Granner co-founded KCMetropolis.org; Kansas City's Journal of the Arts a weekly online magazine.

In 2011 Granner Artistic Directed and performed in "Homecoming, an Evening with Virgil T," the first national PBS taping at the Kauffman Center for the Performing Arts.

In 2011-2012 Granner produced The American Tenors national tour for Nashville-based tour company Live on Stage.

In 2012 he co-founded Gulley/Granner an operatic tenor duo.

In 2014 he performed the tenor roles in Astor Piazzolla's tango operita Maria de Buenos Aires in Szczecin, Poland.

In 2017 he performed as The Magician in Long Beach Opera's The Consul.

In 2018 he performed as Dr. Morel in Long Beach Opera's The Invention of Morel.

== Recordings ==
- "Nathan Granner and Beau Bledsoe: "Selections from Winterreise" (Songs by Schubert, Duparc, Giuliani, Hahn). Touchartists (067461700221)
- The American Tenors. Sony Classical/Odyssey SK87893
- Nathan Granner and Beau Bledsoe: Departure (Songs by Villa-Lobos, Dowland, Lorca, Puccini and others). Tzigane CDNB-202
- Tango Lorca: "Mujer Sola" Granner performs on track 16 Vuelvo al Sur.
- Bradley Cox Ensemble: "Beginners" Granner performs on tracks 2, 12.
- Gulley/Granner: "HYMN --Songs of Great Faith" Hymns, Spirituals and Contemporary Classical pieces.
- Ombre di luce, PENTATONE, 2024

== Sources ==
- Tommasini, Anthony (June 7, 2000). "A Wistful Smile for Treemonisha, a Sad Farewell (but Not Addio) for Violetta". The New York Times.
- Richard Buell, Review: Boston Handel and Haydn Society, Messiah, The Boston Phoenix, Issue Date: December 2–8, 2005. Accessed 12 November 2007
- Drew Minter, 'CD Review: Departure, Opera News, September 2006. Accessed 12 November 2007
- Paul Horsley, 'Mozart was a punk, so Schubert was a goth: Musicians travel the country to prove classical is anything but dull', The Kansas City Star, September 17, 2006.
- McLellan, Joseph (July 12, 1999). "From the NSO, Two Faces Of Bernstein". The Washington Post. Archived from the original on May 16, 2011 – via HighBeam Research.
- Ruhe, Pierre (June 26, 1998). "'A Captivating Cosi Fan Tutte': Wolf Trap's Lively Cast Reinvigorates Mozart's Tale of Innocence Lost". The Washington Post. Archived from the original on May 16, 2011 – via HighBeam Research.
- Paul Horsley, 'The newest singing threesome: the American Tenors', The Kansas City Star, February 21, 2003.
- Eugene H. Cropsey, 'Sacco and Vanzetti: An American World Premiere', The Opera Quarterly, 2003 19(4):754-780, Oxford University Press.
- 'An American Tenor', Encore, The University of Missouri–Kansas City Conservatory of Music, 2003, pp. 2–3
- KCMetropoilis.org via .
- There Stands the Glass, 'Review: An Evening With Virgil T. at Helzberg Hall via .
