= Rick Benjamin (conductor) =

American conductor

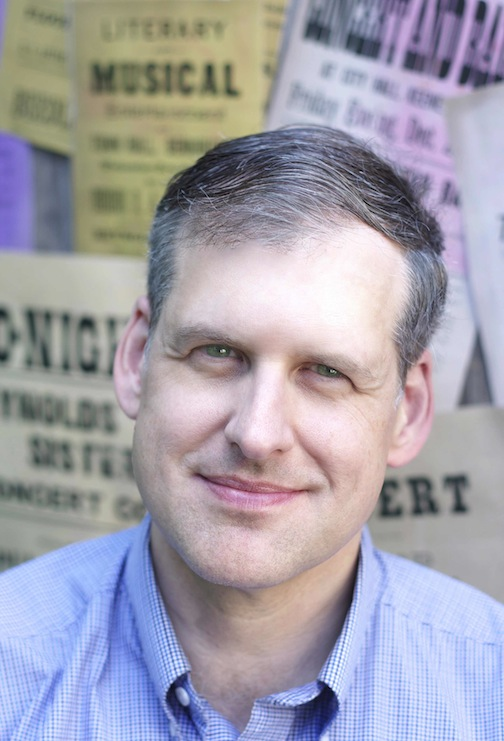
Rick Benjamin, American conductor and historian, photographed on 22 May 2022.

Rick Benjamin is the founder and conductor of the world-renowned Paragon Ragtime Orchestra. Benjamin has active careers as a pianist, researcher, author, and producer of concerts and recordings.

== Early Interest in Ragtime Music ==
Benjamin's interest in ragtime music began in the 1970s when he was eight years old and found a 1917 Victrola in his grandparents' garage. He later recalled that the music he played on the Victrola connected with him in a way that the pop music of his era did not. He said, "I knew in my bones that these performers and their composers were expressing their sheer joy in life through their music."

Benjamin's interest persisted in ragtime, the first popular music conceived and created by Americans in an era where popular songs were brought over from Germany or England.

== Formation of the Paragon Ragtime Orchestra ==
=== Discovery of the Music of Arthur Pryor ===
Benjamin went to Juilliard with intentions to make his living playing the tuba. When his jaw was wired shut after his teeth were inadvertently shattered during a tooth extraction, he found himself temporarily unable to play that instrument and instead focused on writing a research paper on Arthur Pryor, an 1890s trombonist, conductor and music director. Pryor was an influential figure in the early history of the Victrola, as he had served as first conductor for the company that produced them, Victor Talking Machine Co., and had accordingly been able to decide himself what recordings were released for the machine. Benjamin learned that an old theater in Asbury, New Jersey that was scheduled for demolition housed Pryor's personal collection of over 4,000 pieces of music and was given permission to take it. While Benjamin did not immediately understand the value of this collection, which was thought to have been destroyed, he soon realized that among the collection were many rare musical scores and manuscripts, including unknown compositions by such composers as Scott Joplin, W.C. Handy, Edward MacDowell, Victor Herbert, Jerome Kern and John Philip Sousa. In a 1997 interview with the Herald & Review, he explained the presence of these rare pieces: "Anybody who was anybody in that era would send their scores to Mr. Pryor in hopes that they would be recorded" for Victrola.

=== Controversy over Initial Concert at Juilliard ===
In 1986 Benjamin decided to form a 14-piece orchestra of fellow Juilliard students to perform the music as it had been originally arranged during the period. Benjamin made a request to Juilliard to perform a concert of turn-of-the-20th-century American composers but his request was rejected by Juilliard's dean, who felt Juilliard should focus on traditional composers. In response, Benjamin scheduled a tuba recital at the School's concert hall, but instead introduced his new "Paragon Ragtime Orchestra," leaving open the doors to draw in a wider crowd. Before a full house, Benjamin's group played selections by Irving Berlin and Victor Herbert, the W.C. Handy's "Memphis Blues" and Joplin's "Peacherine Two-Step." One witness to the event, Juilliard professor Vincent Persichetti, approached Benjamin after the concert was over to encourage him to make it his "life's work" to preserve "America's original music."

The concert did not go over well with the dean, who put Benjamin on probation for it, but it had a much more positive impact on Grammy Award winning Columbia Records executive Thomas Frost, who to Benjamin's surprise was given a recording of the concert and had within a matter of weeks arranged for the first album of the Paragon Ragtime Orchestra to be released. Benjamin quit Juilliard without fanfare and has since devoted himself to his orchestra.

=== Lincoln Center Debut ===
Benjamin and the Paragon Ragtime Orchestra made their New York debut at the Alice Tully Hall at Lincoln Center in March 1988 with a program consisting of a medley of music from the 1890s and 21 songs from the period ranging 1905 to 1920 which Benjamin had found among Pryor's papers. Allan Kozinn for the New York Times remarked particularly on the variety of the "abidingly energetic fun" performance, which included "a concert waltz, a maxixe, one-steps, two-steps, foxtrots and blues, and, of course, numerous rags, some quite picturesque."

== Musical Activities ==
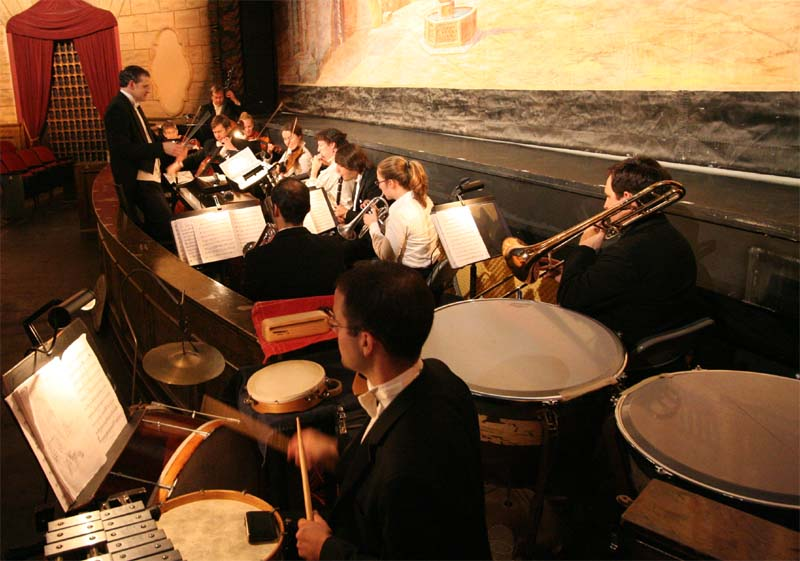
Rick Benjamin and the Paragon Ragtime Orchestra perform the Mark of Zorro starring Douglas Fairbanks at the Poncan Theatre in Ponca City Oklahoma on October 4, 2008.

=== Oh, You Kid! ===
In February 1999, Benjamin and the Paragon Ragtime Orchestra premiered Oh, You Kid! at the Kennedy Center in Washington, DC, in collaboration with the Paul Taylor Dance Company. The work was commissioned under the Doris Duke Millennium Awards for Modern Dance and Jazz Music of the Kennedy Center and American Dance Festival, which promotes such pairings. Anna Kisselgoff wrote in the New York Times that the show was "exuberant romp to ragtime music."

=== Treemonisha ===
In June 2003 Benjamin and the Paragon Ragtime Orchestra premiered their version of Scott Joplin's opera Treemonisha at the Stern Grove Festival, the oldest festival of its kind in the United States, hosted in an amphitheater in San Francisco. Treemonisha had originally premiered in 1975 with full professional staging by the Houston Grand Opera, but Benjamin thought that the Houston staging was "too heavy, too Verdiesque" and spent nearly half of a decade altering it to suit the kind of 12-piece theater pit orchestra prevalent in Joplin's day. In October 2005 Benjamin and the Paragon Ragtime Orchestra premiered his version of Treemonisha on the East Coast at Wake Forest University.

Benjamin has expressed his hope that his simpler orchestration will allow the material to be presented in more modest venues, indicating that Joplin never intended for the "opera" to depend on a large orchestra. Describing the work as "unpretentious", he notes that the opera "is much more an amalgamation of the well-established American traditions of vaudeville, tab-show, melodrama, and minstrelsy, all held together by Joplin's marvelous music." He told the Wake Forest University newspaper that Joplin's "real dream was to give everyday people the opportunity, perhaps their only one, to experience opera on their own terms in the music halls and neighborhood theaters." In another interview, for the San Francisco Chronicle, Benjamin indicated that Joplin was probably himself barred from opera during his day because he was black, but expressed his belief that Joplin realized opera's ability to speak to the public. He has recently recorded the opera for New World Records.

=== Silent Movie Performances ===
Benjamin has an extensive collection of original film scores from the 1900s, 1910s, and 1920s, which his orchestra uses to livescore screenings of films from the Silent Era. Thirty-eight silent films are in their 2026 repertoire, including Buster Keaton's Cops, Harold Lloyd's Never Weaken, and Charlie Chaplin's The Immigrant. Another movie that Benjamin accompanies with his orchestra is The Mark Of Zorro, starring Douglas Fairbanks. Benjamin has expressed surprise that "Generation X" has responded so favorably to the music, suggesting in 1997 that younger listeners may resist the more commercially oriented music "crammed down their throats."

=== Other Musical Activities ===
Benjamin and his orchestra also have performed for diverse radio programs on New York Times' WQXR, National Public Radio, the British Broadcasting Corporation, and the Voice of America networks, and Benjamin has conducted the Aalborg Symphony Orchestra (Denmark), the RTÉ National Symphony Orchestra, Olympia Symphony in Washington State, the New Jersey Symphony, the Iceland Symphony Orchestra, the Washington Performing Arts Society, the Brucknerhaus in Linz, Austria. Benjamin is a touring lecturer and a published author and wrote liner notes on New World Records In addition to curating the collection of Arthur Prior, Benjamin also curates the collections of Simone Mantia, B.F. Alart, and Frank H. Wells and has worked with archivists and historians including Thornton 'Tony Hagert's Vernacular Music Research

=== Awards and honors ===
In the World's Fair held in Seville, Spain, Benjamin and his orchestra were the "Ambassador of Goodwill."

== Composition of Benjamin's Paragon Ragtime Orchestra ==
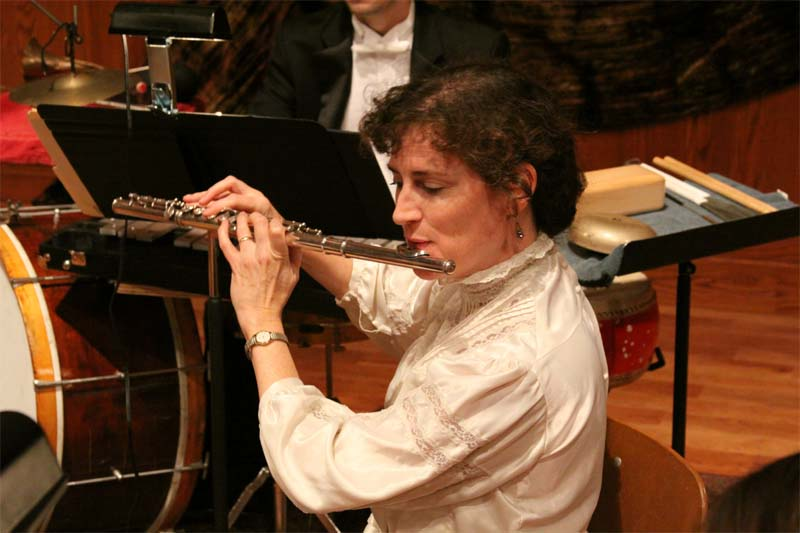
Leslie Cullen plays flute and piccolo for the Paragon Ragtime Orchestra at a performance at Hesston College in Hesston, Kansas in October, 2008.

Because orchestras by their nature and tradition are much more fluid in regards to personnel, there are 36 players on the payroll of the Paragon Ragtime Orchestra and their appearance at a particular performance depends on a wide variety of criteria including the number of players called for by the score(s) to be performed. The score for the silent motion picture Zorro was written for 12 instruments while the orchestra's ragtime program is scored for 10 or 11 players, depending on the publisher and arranger. The main set-up for a theater orchestra of the era was 5 strings, 1 flute, 1/2 clarinets, 1/2 cornets, 1 trombone, Piano/Conductor and percussion. Variations on the instrumentation depended on the publisher of the music, and of the arrangement. Some of the orchestra's programs of historic theater music call for from 25 to 30 musicians and some of the grand silent film scores call for over 70 players, so the orchestra has to hire out when they perform these programs.

The Executive Director the Paragon Ragtime Orchestra is Leslie Cullen who also plays flute and piccolo and has been a member of the orchestra since 1989. Cullen studied at the Juilliard School and is an adjunct at Bucknell University. Cullen has appeared at the Ravinia Festival, The Kennedy Center, Chautauqua, and the Smithsonian Institution. Cullen is a native of Lawton, Oklahoma and was the former artist-in-residence for the State Arts Council of Oklahoma. Cullen has also played with the Royale Trio and the Linden Woodwind Quintet.

== Personal life ==
In addition to his work with his orchestra, Benjamin lectures at Susquehanna University near his home in Lewisburg, Pennsylvania.

== Discography ==
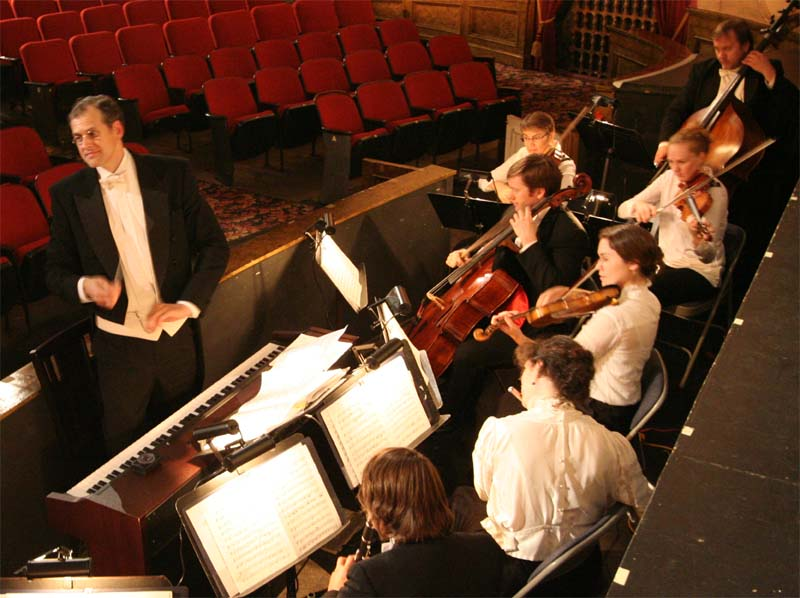
Rick Benjamin and the Paragon Ragtime Orchestra have recorded twenty-two CDs and produced two DVDs of their music accompanying silent movies. Rick Benjamin and the Paragon Ragtime Orchestra perform at the Poncan Theatre in Ponca City Oklahoma on October 4, 2008.

- On The Boardwalk (1986)
- The Whistler And His Dog (1989)
- That Demon Rag! (1992)
- Knockout Drops (1995)
- 'Round The Christmas Tree: Victorian Yuletide Favorites (2001)
- More Candy: Popular Music from the Ragtime Era (2001)
- On The Level...Songs Of Vaudeville & Tin Pan Alley (2001)
- Black Manhattan: Music Of The Famous 'Clef Club' (2003)
- The Paragon Ragtime Orchestra (Finally) Plays 'The Entertainer' (2004)
- From Barrelhouse To Broadway: The Music of Joe Jordan (2006)
- You're A Grand Old Rag: George M. Cohan (2008)
- Midnight Frolic: The Broadway Show Music of Louis A. Hirsch (2010)
- Scott Joplin: Treemonisha - Opera in Three Acts (box set, 2011)
- Black Manhattan Volume II (2012)
- Minding the Score: The Music of Harry L. Alford (2013)
- The Pioneers of Movie Music: Sounds from the American Silent Cinema (2014)
- Irving Berlin: This Is The Life! - The Breakthrough Years 1909-1921 (2015)
- Black Manhattan Volume III (2017)
- Deuces Wild (2021)
- Cake-Walk In The Sky (2024)
- Meet Me At The Fair!: Sounds from the Great American World's Fairs (2026)

== Videography ==
- The Mark of Zorro starring Douglas Fairbanks, Featuring the Original 1920 Score (2008)
- Paragon's Charlie Chaplin Moving Picture Show (1999)
- The Deserter (2004)
- The Forgotten Films of Roscoe "Fatty" Arbuckle (2005)
- PBS Great Performances - Now Hear This: Everyone Loves Joplin (2026)
