= Sunflower Slow Drag =

Ragtime composition by Scott Joplin and Scott Hayden

- by Scott Joplin and Scott Hayden
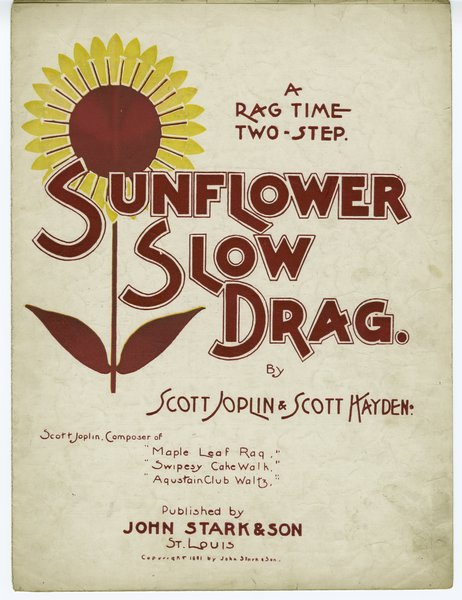
- Genre: Ragtime
- Form: Rag Time Two Step
- Published: 1901
- Publisher: John Stark & Son
- Instrument: Piano Solo

Sunflower Slow Drag
A wind band arrangement of a piano original performed in 1994 by the United States Marine Corps Band

"Sunflower Slow Drag" is a ragtime composition by Scott Joplin and Scott Hayden. It is about four minutes long and has been described as "full of gaiety and sunshine".

== Musical structure ==
Intro A A B B A Trio-Intro C C D D

While Joplin's name was given top billing, Jasen and Tichenor assert that everything except the trio was primarily Hayden's work. The trio, attributed to Joplin, is distinguished by its softer dynamics, pentatonic emphasis, and broader range.

== Publication history ==
The copyright was registered March 18, 1901. The piece was originally published by John Stillwell Stark, who advertised it as "the twin sister of Maple Leaf". Stark also reported that the trio was written during Joplin's courtship of Belle Hayden, his first wife, who was also Scott Hayden's sister-in-law, his brother's widow.

== See also ==
- List of compositions by Scott Joplin
