= Joseph N. Gallo =

American mobster (1912-1995)

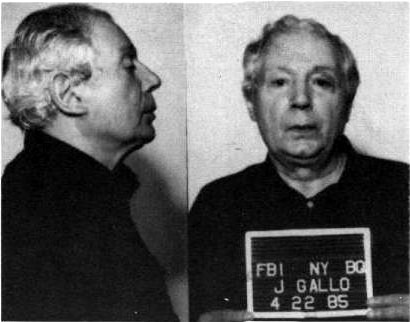
- FBI mugshot of Gallo on April 22, 1985
- Born: Joseph Nicholas Gallo; January 8, 1912; Calabria, Italy
- Died: September 1, 1995 (aged 83); Queens, New York, U.S.
- Resting place: St. Michael's Cemetery (New York)

Joseph Nicholas Gallo (January 8, 1912 – September 1, 1995) was a New York mobster who served as consigliere of the Gambino crime family under three different bosses.

Joseph N. Gallo was not related to Joe Gallo of the Colombo crime family.

== Biography ==
Joseph N. Gallo was born on January 8, 1912, in Calabria, but grew up in the Little Italy section of Manhattan. Gallo was married and was the father of Gambino associate Joseph C. Gallo. Joseph N. Gallo and his family lived in Mill Basin, Brooklyn and Long Island City, Queens.

In the 1930s, Gallo was convicted in New York of illegal gambling.

Over the years, Gallo built his power base in the New York garment industry. He owned a dress manufacturing company in Brooklyn and eventually controlled the Greater Blouse, Shirt, and Undergarment Association, a trade group.

Gallo also had strong ties with the Trafficante crime family of Tampa, Florida, and the New Orleans crime family boss Carlos Marcello. Gallo frequently represented their leaders at Cosa Nostra meetings in New York.

In the early 1970s, Gallo replaced Joseph Riccobono as consigliere under boss Carlo Gambino. Gallo was considered as a possible candidate to succeed the ailing Gambino. However, on February 21, 1974, Gallo suffered a severe heart attack. Gallo recovered from this illness, but decided that he did not have the will or stamina to be Gambino's successor. After Gambino's death in 1976, Gallo continued as consigliere for boss Paul Castellano. In 1986, after Castellano's assassination, new boss John Gotti also kept Gallo as consigliere.

On December 22, 1987, Gallo was convicted of Racketeer Influenced and Corrupt Organizations Act charges that included two counts of bribery and one count of illegal interstate travel to commit bribery. In February 1988, Gallo was sentenced to 10 years in federal prison and ordered to pay fines totaling $380,000. Before his sentence, he was released on parole to spend a last Christmas with his family, since at his age any sentence imposed on him would have assured he would die in prison. He became the oldest inmate in federal custody. In 1987, Gallo after holding the position for twenty years was demoted in favour of Salvatore Gravano. This move was already decided upon following the Castellano hit. However, Gotti waited until 1987 to do so.

In 1995, Gallo was released from prison. On September 1, 1995, Gallo died of natural causes in Astoria, Queens. He is buried in St. Michaels Cemetery in East Elmhurst, Queens.

American Mafia
Preceded by Joseph "Staten Island Joe" Riccobono	Gambino crime family Consigliere; 1967–1987	Succeeded by Salvatore "Sammy the Bull" Gravano
