= Elite Syncopations =

Ragtime composition by Scott Joplin

- by Scott Joplin
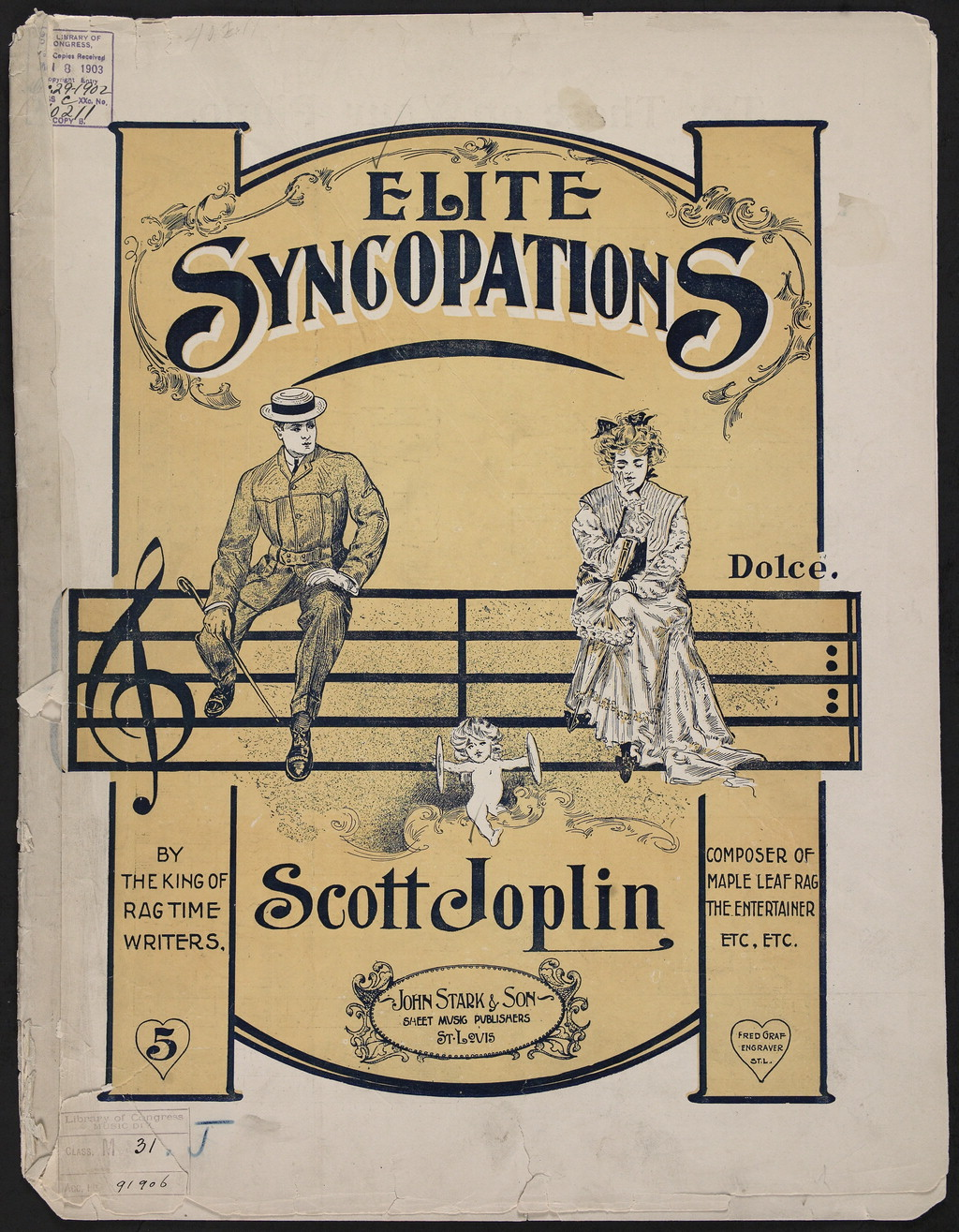
- First edition sheet music cover.
- Genre: Ragtime
- Form: Rag
- Composed: 1902
- Published: 1903
- Publisher: John Stark & Son

Audio sample
- file; help

"Elite Syncopations" is a 1902 ragtime piano composition by American composer Scott Joplin, originally published in 1903 by John Stark & Son. The cover of the original sheet music prominently features a well-dressed man and lady sitting on a treble staff, looking down upon a cherub clutching a cymbal in each hand, which reflects plainly the title of the piece. In 1974, the British Royal Ballet, under director Kenneth MacMillan, created the ballet Elite Syncopations based on tunes by Joplin and other composers of the era.

== Musical structure ==
The piece's musical structure is:

Intro A A B B A C C D D

It begins in F major, and modulates to B♭ major at the beginning of the C section, where it remains until the end of the piece. In addition, many parts of the piece are somewhat chromatic, especially section A.

== See also ==
- List of compositions by Scott Joplin
