= John Ruhl (sculptor) =

American sculptor (1873–1940)

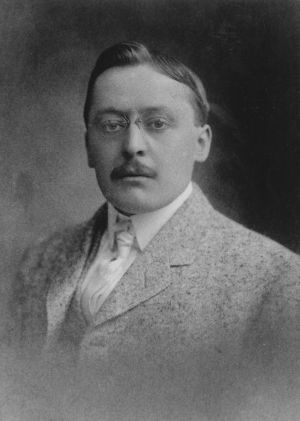
John Ruhl, 1873-1940

John Ruhl (April 14, 1873 – November 19, 1940) was an American sculptor known for his contributions to public art and his influence on bookend design.

== Early life ==
John Ruhl was born in New York City to Anton and Frieda Ruhl. Despite early aspirations to pursue art, Ruhl initially entered the workforce as an insurance clerk upon leaving the public school system, due to parental pressure. Dissatisfied with clerical work, he enrolled he enrolled in the Metropolitan Museum of Art School in 1888. In April of the following year, he won a school competition with his sculpture "For a Yacht Race", a plaster vase engraved with yachts and a dolphin handle.

This, along with the $100 prize, prompted his parents to support his artistic endeavours. Subsequently, Ruhl undertook a three-year course of study under sculptor Frank Edwin Elwell.

== Career ==
Between 1905 and 1920, Ruhl was employed by Piccirilli Brothers. During this period he was involved in creating the marble lions in front of the New York Public Library Main Branch and the Lincoln Memorial in Washington, D.C.

Collectors of antique bookends are familiar with Ruhl's work. Ruhl's involvement in creating bookends began in 1915 and continued until his death in 1940. Most of his work was for J.B. Hirsch and Armor Bronze. Some work was also done for K&O (Kronheim and Oldenbusch).

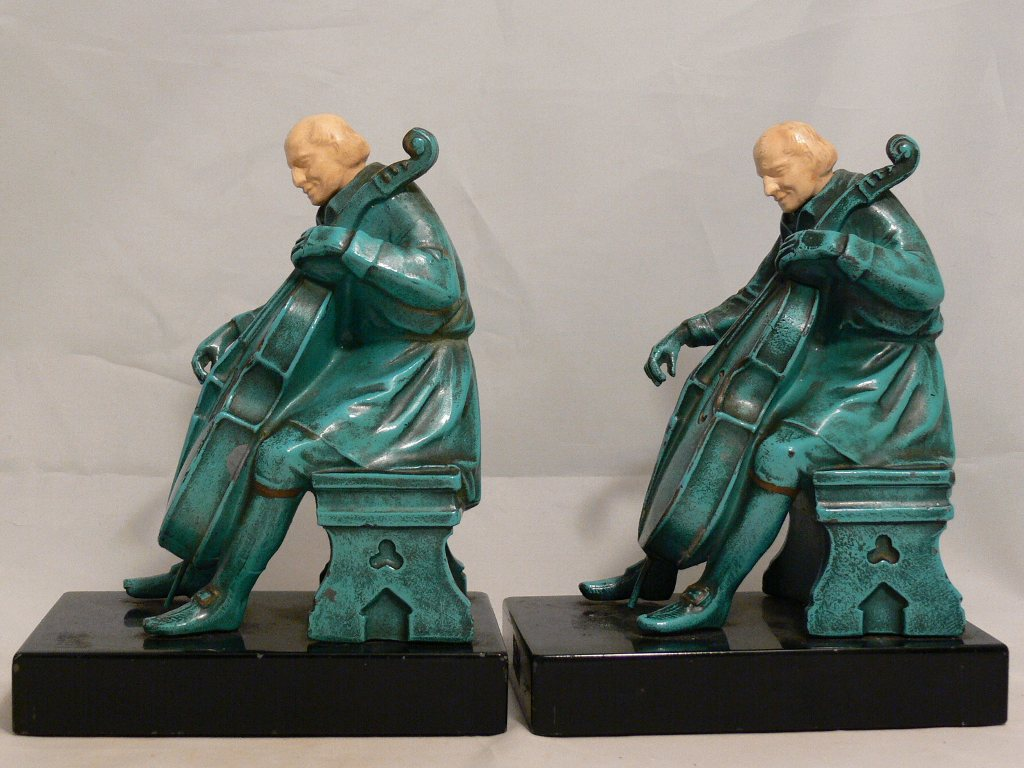
Popular Bookend The Cello Player

Ruhl also sculpted the Indian head, Chief Obbatinewat, the floor seal for the Shawmut Bank of Boston. In April 1894, he created a death mask of David Dudley Field, an American lawyer.

Ruhl remained a pupil of Mr. Elwell in 1894 and stayed with him for at least three years. Family records indicate that Ruhl helped set up two memorials: the Edwin Booth bronze bas relief at Mount Auburn Cemetery in Cambridge, Massachusetts and the General Winfield Scott Hancock bronze equestrian statue at Gettysburg, Pennsylvania. The Booth Memorial was completed in 1894 and the Hancock Memorial in 1896. It is possible that Ruhl continued his studies at the Metropolitan Museum until the closing of their school in 1894 and then went to study under Elwell.

April 1894 marked a pivotal moment in Ruhl's career. Two days before he created his Death Mask, the April 13th edition of the New York Times reported that the 16th annual exhibition of the Society of American Artists was closing its doors, so the paintings and sculptures would be available for purchase.In this exhibition, both Ruhl and his mentor, Frank Edwin Elwell, had works showcased. Ruhl's work received critical acclaim, contrasting the lukewarm reception of Elwell's piece.

The New York Times reported: "Diana of the Spear by Edwin F Elwell is a plaster statuette whose intention is better than its realization. The nude Diana is an ungraceful and perhaps impossible attitude with her legs apart and her weight on the right toes, while she is in the act of brandishing rather than hurling a spear. The modeling of the right breast and the right arm drawn back in the act of hurling is as questionable as the position of feet and legs. Though Diana was a goddess we have no right to assume that she could or would take such a pose when driving the spear at her antlered prey in the Forest of Arcady." The article was more praiseworthy of Ruhl, writing that "There is a good plaster bust of young Mr. Bureau of Philadelphia by John Ruhl".

Some of the Society of American Artists' exhibition catalogs were preserved. One of which, a copy of the 1984 exhibit, is housed at the Thomas Watson Library of the Metropolitan Museum of Art. Altogether there were 317 exhibits, each displayed nearly the same number of artists, and only 13 of these exhibits featured sculptures – all of which were located in the Central Gallery. Ruhl was Exhibitor #315 with his "Portrait of Mr. B." Other prominent exhibitors at the event were Alexander Sterling Calder, Augustus Saint Gaudens, and Ruhl's own mentor, Frank Elwell.

Ruhl's final project was the 1939 GM Futurama Exhibit at the New York World's Fair. Collaborating with numerous skilled artists, he created scale models for the "Building the World of Tomorrow" exhibit. During this time, he was employed by George Wittbold, the builder.

After his death on November 19, 1940, Ruhl was interred at St. Michael's Cemetery in Queens, New York.

== Awards ==
In 1913, John was listed in Who's Who in American Art. His qualifications included "Pupil of the Metropolitan Museum Art School under John Ward Stimson and Francis Edwin Elwell."

Years later he was also listed in Who Was Who in American Art 1564–1975, a three-volume book edited by Peter Hastings Falk.

John won several Society of Beaux-Arts Architects medals: first place for sculpture in 1913–14, two second places for sculpture in 1915–16, and two first places for sculpture in 1916–17.

In January 1915 he was awarded the first prize of $76 ($1,604 current buying power) in the Mrs. Henry Payne Whitney (Gertrude Vanderbilt Whitney) competition for students with a sculpture entitled "Youth." It shows a slender-limbed nude youth reaching out his toe to frighten a frog.

By merging classical techniques with contemporary themes, John Ruhl left an indelible mark on American sculpture and decorative arts.

== Sources ==
- Ahumada, Belladora Maria (January 25, 2008). "Bookends are double the fun". Antique Week.
- Architectural League of New York (1914). Year Book of the Architectural League of New York and Catalogue of the Twenty-Ninth Annual Exhibition. Vol. 29. Secretary of the Architectural League of New York.
- General Motors Corp. (1940). Futurama: 1940 NYC World's Fair General Motors Exhibit (First ed.). New York: General Motors Corp.
- Koffler, Jerry; Koffler, Eleanor (2008). Freeing the Angel from the Stone: A Guide to Piccirilli Sculpture in New York City. John D. Calandra Italian American Institute, Queens College/CUNY. ISBN 978-0970340320.
- Kuritzky, Louis; De Costa, Charles (2005). Collector's Encyclopedia of Bookends: Identification & Values. Collector Books. ISBN 978-1574324334.
- Larkin, Susan G. (2006). Top Cats: The Life and Times of the New York Public Library Lions. Pomegranate. ISBN 978-0764937620.
- McBride, Gerald (1997). A Collector's Guide to Cast Metal Bookends. Atglen, Penn.: Schiffer Publishing. ISBN 978-0764300400.
- Society of American Artists (1894). Annual Exhibition. Vol. 16. New York.
- Society of Beaux-Arts Architects (1914). Year Book of the Society of Beaux-Arts Architects and of the Beaux-Arts Institute of Design. Society of Beaux-Arts Architects.
- Society of Beaux Arts Architects and National Sculpture (1915). Thirtieth Annual Exhibition.
- Society of Beaux Arts Architects and National Sculpture (1916). Index of Exhibits Thirty-First Annual Exhibition.
