= Scott Hayden =

American composer

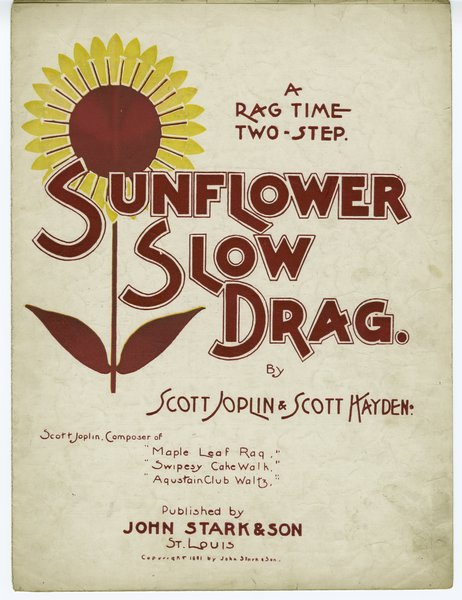
Sheet music cover of "Sunflower Slow Drag"

Scott Hayden (March 31, 1882 — September 16, 1915) was an American composer of ragtime music.

== Life ==
Sunflower Slow Drag
Scott Joplin and Scott Hayden penned the "Sunflower Slow Drag" in 1901. This is a brass band arrangement of a piano original performed in 1994 by the United States Marine Corps Band.

Born in Sedalia, Missouri, he was the son of Marion and Julia Hayden. Hayden is remembered today for the four rags he composed in collaboration with Scott Joplin, "Sunflower Slow Drag," "Something Doing," "Felicity Rag," "Kismet Rag" and also for another composition he wrote himself, "Pear Blossoms". There was a family connection of sorts between the two men, since Joplin's first wife, Belle Hayden, had been Scott Hayden's sister-in-law. Hayden married Nora Wright and lived with the Joplins in St. Louis.

Nora died giving birth to a daughter in 1901. Hayden moved to Chicago, got a job as an elevator operator in the Cook County Hospital, and married Jeanette Wilkins. He died in Chicago of pulmonary tuberculosis, leaving "Pear Blossoms" unfinished.
