= St. Michael's Cemetery (Queens) =

Historic cemetery in Queens, New York City

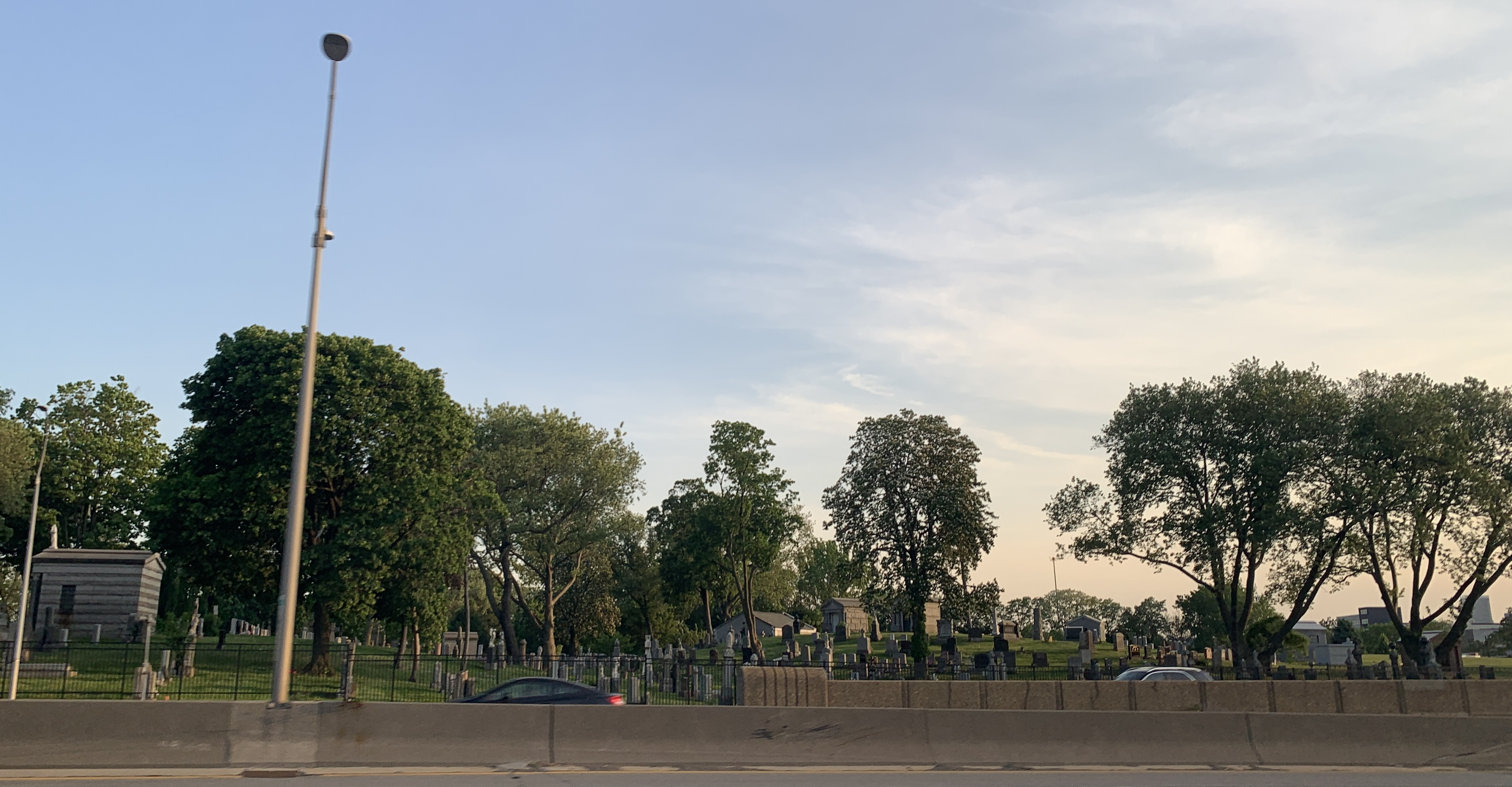
- View of the cemetery, looking south from Astoria Boulevard, 2021
- Interactive map of St. Michael's Cemetery

Details
- Established: 1852; 173 years ago
- Location: East Elmhurst, New York
- Country: United States
- Coordinates: 40°45′53″N 73°53′56″W
- Owned by: St. Michael's Episcopal Church
- Size: 88 acres (36 ha)
- Website: stmichaelscemetery.com

St. Michael's Cemetery is a cemetery located in East Elmhurst, Queens, New York. It is owned and operated by St. Michael's Episcopal Church in Manhattan. It was founded in 1852.

== All Souls Crematorium ==
There's a crematory located on the grounds of St. Michael’s Cemetery, which has been operating since 2005.

== Notable burials ==
- Scott Joplin (1868–1917), composer and pianist
- Frank Costello (1891–1973), organized crime boss
- John J. Flemm (1896–1974), businessman and politician
- Joseph N. Gallo (1912–1995), organized crime consigliere
- Emile Griffith (1938–2013), professional boxer
- Luovi Halling (1867–1928), Medal of Honor recipient
- George Low (1847–1912), peacetime Medal of Honor Recipient
- Charles Moore (1847–1891), Civil War Medal of Honor Recipient
- John Ruhl (1873–1940), sculptor
- Yomo Toro (1933–2012), musician
- Granville Woods (1856–1910), American inventor
- Tim Keller (1950–2023), Calvinist pastor and theologian
