= Edward A. Berlin =

American musicologist

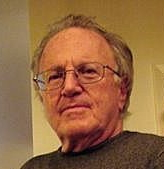
- Born: June 26, 1936 (age 90); New York City, New York, U.S.
- Education: Queens College (BA); Hunter College (MA); CUNY Graduate Center (PhD)
- Occupations: Musicologist, computer programmer, probation officer
- Spouse: Andrée de Plata
- Website: www.edwardaberlin.com

Edward A. Berlin (born June 26, 1936) is an American author and musicologist, known for his research, writings, and presentations on ragtime and the composer Scott Joplin. He has written three books on these topics, and has also written and spoken extensively on other musical subjects.

== Early life and education ==
Born in New York City, he grew up in Far Rockaway, a suburban community in Queens County, on the edge of the city. In his early teens, he studied popular piano with Morty Kessler. At age 15, he began playing piano with local dance bands and at Catskill Mountain resort hotels, continuing this activity until age 22. Toward the latter part of this period, he also studied classical piano with Adela Bay, a younger sister of Emanuel Bay, a long-time accompanist of Jascha Heifetz. Berlin, recognizing his technical pianistic limitations, decided against a music career and earned a B.A. in economics from Queens College in 1959. Shortly before graduation, in 1958, he married Andrée de Plata, another Queens College student. They have three daughters.

== Career ==
His initial post-college employments were as a case worker with New York's Department of Welfare, and then as a probation officer with the Office of Probation. During this time, he returned to college as a part-time student, earning an M.A. in music history in 1965 at Hunter College. His master's thesis, written under the guidance of H. Wiley Hitchcock, was “Tonality and Tonal References in the Serial Music of Igor Stravinsky.” The thesis was praised by the composer, who wrote, “Your professional analysis has certainly succeeded in illuminating the right approach to my music.” With his M.A. degree, he joined the teaching staff of Hunter College's music department, and afterwards taught at several other colleges in New York. He earned his Ph.D. in musicology from the City University of New York (CUNY) in 1976 with the dissertation “Piano Ragtime: A Musical and Cultural Study,” again under the guidance of Hitchcock. A modified form of the dissertation became his first book, Ragtime: A Music and Cultural History (University of California Press, 1980).

During and after these early years of teaching, he also accepted freelance assignments. Most notable of these were editing Nicolas Slonimsky in the 6th edition of Baker's Biographical Dictionary of Musicians (1978), and designing a Duke Ellington exhibit (“Love You Madly”) at the New York Public Library for the Performing Arts, Lincoln Center (1979).

From 1980 to 1998 he was a computer programmer and also taught the subject for several years at Queensborough Community College. He continued his musical activities during this period, writing many articles and giving presentations on various musical topics, mostly ragtime related, and publishing his three books. In the fall semester of 1982, he served as Senior Research Fellow (Visiting professor) at Brooklyn College's Institute for Studies in American Music, giving a graduate course in ragtime and writing the monograph Reflections and Research on Ragtime (1987). In the 1998–99 academic year, he was again a visiting professor at Brooklyn College and acting director of the Institute for Studies in American Music. His third book is King of Ragtime: Scott Joplin and His Era (Oxford University Press, 1994; 2nd edition 2016).

He retired in mid-1999 and continues his musical activities as a researcher, writer, and lecturer. Since 2005, he has organized the annual Scott Joplin Memorial Concerts at St. Michael's Cemetery in Queens, New York, where the composer is interred. For the 2017 event, which commemorated the 100th anniversary of Joplin's death, he established a fund to place an engraved memorial bench next to the composer's grave.

== Awards ==
1965. George N. Shuster Award for the best thesis of the year at Hunter College: “Tonality and Tonal References in the Serial Music of Igor Stravinsky.”

1988. An ASCAP-Deems Taylor Award for Reflections and Research on Ragtime.

== Media ==
From 1979 through 2022, Berlin appeared on numerous Radio and TV programs in the United States, United Kingdom, Netherlands, Germany, and Hungary.

In 2005, he was portrayed as a fictional character in Tananarive Due's novel Joplin's Ghost (Atria Books).

Two of his books were featured in the acrostic puzzle in the New York Times Magazine on August 2, 1992, and October 2, 1994.
