= Scott Joplin =

American composer and pianist (1868–1917)

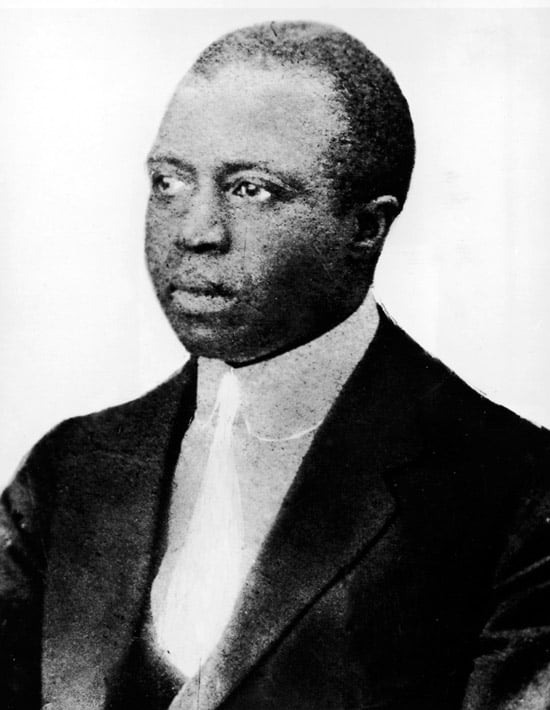
- Joplin in 1912
- Born: November 24, 1868; Texarkana, Texas or Linden, Texas, US (disputed)
- Died: April 1, 1917 (aged 48); New York City, US
- Burial place: St. Michael's Cemetery
- Education: George R. Smith College
- Occupations: Composer; pianist; music teacher
- Years active: 1895–1917
- Works: List of compositions
- Spouses: Belle Jones (m. 1899; div. 1903) Freddie Alexander (m. 1904; died 1904) Lottie Stokes (m. 1909) (1877–1954)
- Awards: Pulitzer Prize (posthumous, 1976)

Scott Joplin (November 24, 1868 – April 1, 1917) was an American composer and pianist. Dubbed the "King of Ragtime", he composed more than 40 ragtime pieces, one ragtime ballet (original version of "The Ragtime Dance", 1899/1902), and two operas. One of his first and most popular pieces, the "Maple Leaf Rag", became the genre's first and most influential hit, later being recognized as the quintessential rag. Joplin considered ragtime to be a form of classical music meant to be played in concert halls and largely disdained the performance of ragtime as honky tonk music most common in saloons.

Joplin grew up in a musical family of railway laborers in Texarkana, Texas. During the late 1880s, he traveled the American South as a musician. He went to Chicago for the World's Fair of 1893, which helped make ragtime a national craze by 1897. Joplin moved to Sedalia, Missouri, in 1894 and worked as a piano teacher. He began publishing music in 1895, and his "Maple Leaf Rag" in 1899 brought him fame and a steady income. In 1901, Joplin moved to St. Louis and two years later scored his first opera, A Guest of Honor. It was confiscated—along with his belongings—for non-payment of bills and is now considered lost. In 1907, Joplin moved to New York City to (unsuccessfully) find a producer for a new opera. In 1916, Joplin descended into dementia from neurosyphilis. His 1917 death marks the end of the "Ragtime era".

Joplin's music was rediscovered and returned to popularity in the early 1970s with the release of a million-selling album, Scott Joplin: Piano Rags, recorded by Joshua Rifkin. This was followed by the Academy Award–winning 1973 film The Sting, which features several of Joplin's compositions. Treemonisha, his second opera, was produced in 1972; and, in 1976, Joplin was posthumously awarded a Pulitzer Prize.

== Early life ==
Joplin was the second of six children born to Giles Joplin, a former slave from North Carolina, and Florence Givens, a freeborn African-American woman from Kentucky. His birth date was accepted by early biographers Rudi Blesh and James Haskins as November 24, 1868, although later biographer Edward A. Berlin showed this was most likely incorrect and that he was likely born between June 1867 and mid-January 1868. There is disagreement over his exact place of birth in Texas, with Blesh identifying Texarkana, and Berlin showing the earliest record of Joplin being the June 1870 census which locates him as a two-year-old in Linden (about 40 miles from Texarkana).

By 1880, the Joplins had moved to Texarkana, Arkansas, where Giles worked as a railroad laborer and Florence as a cleaner. As Joplin's father had played the violin for plantation parties in North Carolina and his mother sang and played the banjo, Joplin was given a rudimentary musical education by his family, and from the age of seven he was allowed to play the piano while his mother cleaned.

At some point in the early 1880s, Giles Joplin left the family for another woman and Florence struggled to support her children through domestic work. Biographer Susan Curtis speculates that Florence's support of her son's musical education was a critical factor behind her separation from Giles, who wanted the boy to pursue practical employment that would supplement the family income.

At 16, Joplin performed in a vocal quartet with three other boys in and around Texarkana, also playing piano. He also taught guitar and mandolin. According to a family friend, the young Joplin was serious and ambitious in studying music and playing the piano after school. While a few local teachers aided him, he received most of his musical education from Julius Weiss, a German-born American Jewish music professor who had immigrated to Texas in the late 1860s and was employed as music tutor by a prominent local business family. Weiss, as described by San Diego Jewish World writer Eric George Tauber, "was no stranger to [receiving] race hatred ... As a Jew in Germany, he was often slapped and called a 'Christ-killer'". Weiss had studied music at a German university and was listed in town records as a professor of music. Impressed by Joplin's talent, and realizing the Joplin family's dire straits, Weiss taught him free of charge. While tutoring Joplin from the age of 11 until he turned 16, Weiss introduced him to folk and classical music, including opera. Weiss helped Joplin appreciate music as an "art as well as an entertainment" and helped Florence acquire a used piano. According to Joplin's widow Lottie, Joplin never forgot Weiss. In his later years, after achieving fame as a composer, Joplin sent his former teacher "gifts of money when he was old and ill" until Weiss died.

== Life in the Southern states and Chicago ==
In the late 1880s, having performed at various local events as a teenager, Joplin gave up his job as a railroad laborer and left Texarkana to become a traveling musician. Little is known about his movements at this time, although he is recorded in Texarkana in July 1891 as a member of the Texarkana Minstrels, who were raising money for a monument to Jefferson Davis, president of the former Confederate States of America. However, Joplin soon learned that there were few opportunities for black pianists. Churches and brothels were among the few options for steady work. Joplin played pre-ragtime "jig-piano" in various red-light districts throughout the mid-South, and some claim he was in Sedalia and St. Louis, Missouri, during this time.

In 1893, while in Chicago for the World's Fair, Joplin formed a band in which he played cornet and also arranged the band's music. Although the World's Fair minimized the involvement of African Americans, black performers still came to the saloons, cafés, and brothels that lined the fair. The exposition was attended by 27 million visitors and had a profound effect on many areas of American cultural life, including ragtime. Although specific information is sparse, numerous sources have credited the Chicago World's Fair with spreading the popularity of ragtime. Joplin found that his music, as well as that of other black performers, was popular with visitors. By 1897, ragtime had become a national craze in U.S. cities and was described by the St. Louis Dispatch as "a veritable call of the wild, which mightily stirred the pulses of city-bred people".

== Life in Missouri ==
Maple Leaf Rag
1906 recording of the "Maple Leaf Rag" by the United States Marine Band. This is the oldest surviving recording of the "Maple Leaf Rag"

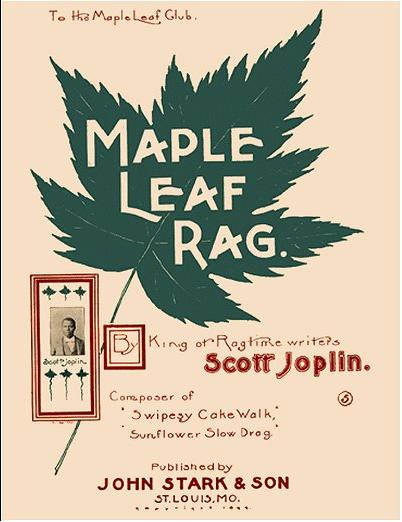
Front cover of the third edition of the "Maple Leaf Rag" sheet music with Joplin portrait

In 1894, Joplin arrived in Sedalia, Missouri. At first, Joplin stayed with the family of Arthur Marshall, a 13-year-old boy who later became one of Joplin's students and a ragtime composer in his own right. There is no record of Joplin having a residence in the town until 1904, as Joplin was making a living as a touring musician.

There is little precise evidence known about Joplin's activities at this time, although he performed as a solo musician at dances and at the major black clubs in Sedalia, the Black 400 Club and the Maple Leaf Club. He performed in the Queen City Cornet Band and his own six-piece dance orchestra. A tour with his own singing group, the Texas Medley Quartet, gave him his first opportunity to publish his own compositions, and it is known that he went to Syracuse, New York, and Texas. Three businessmen from Syracuse (M. L. Mantell and the Leiter brothers) published Joplin's first two works, the songs "Please Say You Will" and "A Picture of Her Face", in 1895. Joplin's visit to Temple, Texas, enabled him to have three pieces published there in 1896, including the "Great Crush Collision March", which commemorated a planned train crash on the Missouri–Kansas–Texas Railroad on September 15 that he may have witnessed. The march was described by one of Joplin's biographers as a "special ... early essay in ragtime". While in Sedalia, Joplin taught piano to students who included future ragtime composers Arthur Marshall, Brun Campbell and Scott Hayden. Joplin enrolled at the George R. Smith College, where he apparently studied "advanced harmony and composition". The college's records were destroyed in a fire in 1925, and biographer Edward A. Berlin notes that it was unlikely that a small college for African-Americans would be able to provide such a course.

Although there were hundreds of rags in print by the time the "Maple Leaf Rag" was published, Joplin was not far behind. He completed his first published rag, "Original Rags" in 1897, the same year that the first ragtime work appeared in print, the "Mississippi Rag" by William Krell. The "Maple Leaf Rag" was likely to have been known in Sedalia before its publication in 1899; Brun Campbell claimed to have seen the manuscript of the work in around 1898. The exact circumstances that led to the publication of the "Maple Leaf Rag" are unknown and a number of versions of the event contradict each other. After several unsuccessful approaches to publishers, Joplin signed a contract on August 10, 1899, with John Stillwell Stark, a retailer of musical instruments who became his most important publisher. The contract stipulated that Joplin would receive a 1% royalty on all sales of the rag, with a minimum sales price of 25 cents. With the inscription "To the Maple Leaf Club" prominently visible along the top of at least some editions, it is likely that the rag was named after the Maple Leaf Club, although there is no direct evidence to prove the link, and there were many other possible sources for the name in and around Sedalia at the time.

Bethena

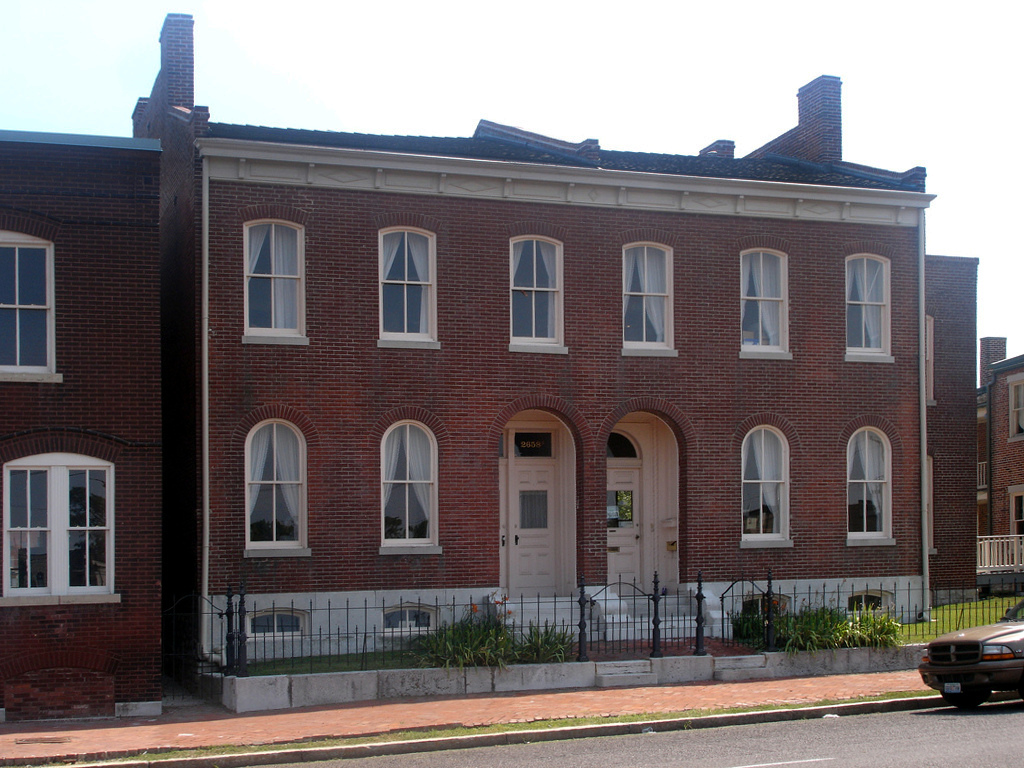
Scott Joplin House in St. Louis, Missouri

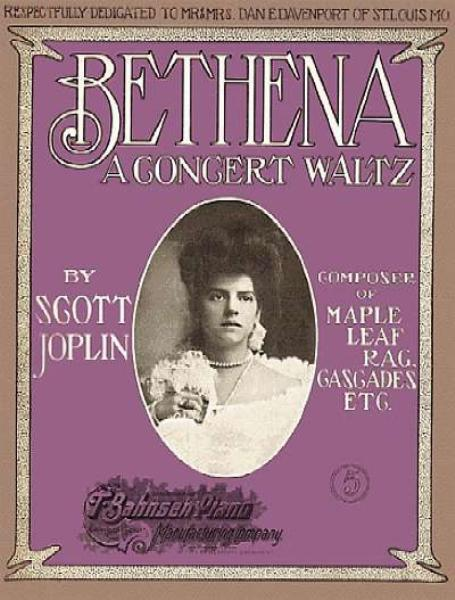
Cover of Scott Joplin's 1905 work "Bethena"; the woman on the cover may be Joplin's second wife, Freddie Alexander

There have been many claims about the sales of the "Maple Leaf Rag", one being that Joplin was the first musician to sell 1 million copies of a piece of instrumental music. Joplin's first biographer, Rudi Blesh, wrote that during its first six months the piece sold 75,000 copies and became "the first great instrumental sheet music hit in America". However, research by Joplin's later biographer Edward A. Berlin demonstrated that this was not the case; the initial print-run of 400 took one year to sell, and, under the terms of Joplin's contract with a 1% royalty, would have given Joplin an income of $1 (or approximately $39 at current prices). Later sales were steady and would have given Joplin an income that would have covered his expenses. In 1909, estimated sales would have given him an income of $600 annually (approximately $16,968 in current prices).

The "Maple Leaf Rag" did serve as a model for the hundreds of rags to come from future composers, especially in the development of classic ragtime. After the publication of the "Maple Leaf Rag", Joplin was soon being described as "King of rag time writers", not least by himself on the covers of his own work, such as "The Easy Winners" and "Elite Syncopations".

During his time in St. Louis, Joplin collaborated with Scott Hayden in the composition of four rags. It was in St. Louis that Joplin produced some of his best-known works, including "The Entertainer", "March Majestic", and the short theatrical work "The Ragtime Dance". In 1901, Joplin married his first wife Belle Jones (1875–1903) a sister-in-law of Scott Hayden. By 1903, the Joplins had moved to a 13-room house, renting some of the rooms to lodgers, who included pianist-composers Arthur Marshall and Scott Hayden. Joplin did not work as a pianist in the saloons in St Louis, which was usually a major source of income for musicians, as he was "probably outclassed by the competition" and was, according to Stark's son, "a mediocre pianist". Biographer Berlin speculated that by 1903 Joplin was already showing early signs of syphilis, which reduced his coordination and "pianistic skills". In 1903, Joplin's only child—a daughter—died. After returning to Arkansas, Joplin and his first wife drifted apart, ending their marriage.

In June 1904, Joplin married Freddie Alexander of Little Rock, Arkansas, the young woman to whom he had dedicated "The Chrysanthemum". She died on September 10, 1904, of complications resulting from a cold, ten weeks after their wedding. "Bethena", Joplin's first work copyrighted after Freddie's death, was described by one biographer as "an enchantingly beautiful piece that is among the greatest of ragtime waltzes".

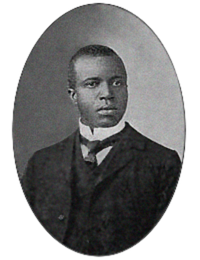
Joplin in 1907

During this time, Joplin created an opera company of 30 people and produced his first opera A Guest of Honor for a national tour. It is not certain how many productions were staged, or even whether this was an all-black show or a racially mixed production. During the tour, either in Springfield, Illinois, or Pittsburg, Kansas, someone associated with the company stole the box office receipts. Joplin could not meet the company's payroll or pay for its lodgings at a theatrical boarding house. It is believed that the score for A Guest of Honor was lost and perhaps destroyed because of non-payment of the company's boarding house bill.

== Later years and death ==
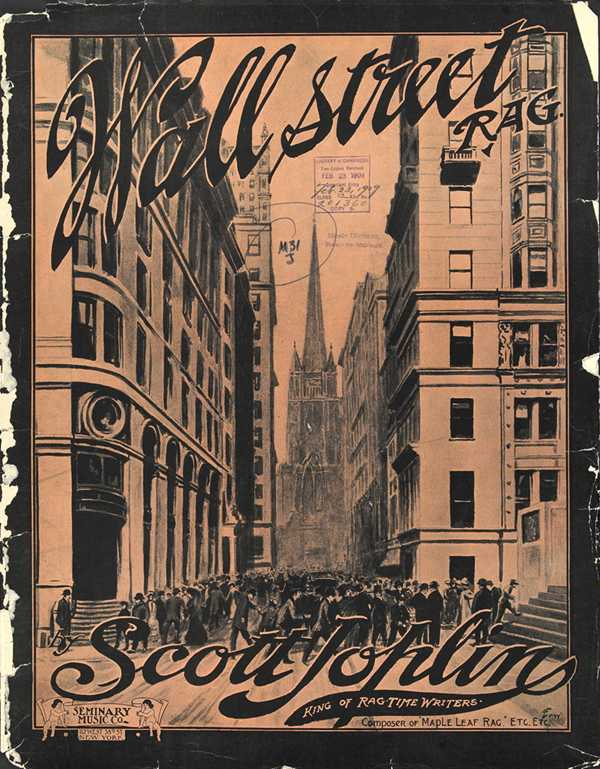
Front cover of the "Wall Street Rag" (1909) sheet music

In 1907, Joplin moved to New York City, which he believed was the best place to find a producer for a new opera. After his move to New York, Joplin met Lottie Stokes, whom he married in 1909. In 1911, unable to find a publisher, Joplin undertook the financial burden of publishing Treemonisha himself in piano-vocal format. In 1915, as a last-ditch effort to see it performed, he invited a small audience to hear it at a rehearsal hall in Harlem. Poorly staged and with only Joplin on piano accompaniment, it was "a miserable failure" to a public not ready for "crude" black musical forms—so different from the European grand opera of that time. The audience, including potential backers, was indifferent and walked out. Scott writes that "after a disastrous single performance...Joplin suffered a breakdown. He was bankrupt, discouraged, and worn out." He concludes that few American artists of his generation faced such obstacles: "Treemonisha went unnoticed and unreviewed, largely because Joplin had abandoned commercial music in favor of art music, a field closed to African Americans." It was not until the 1970s that the opera received a full theatrical staging.

In 1914, Joplin and Lottie self-published his "Magnetic Rag" as the Scott Joplin Music Company, which he had formed the previous December. Biographer Vera Brodsky Lawrence speculates that Joplin was aware of his advancing deterioration due to syphilis and was "consciously racing against time". In her sleeve notes on the 1992 Deutsche Grammophon release of Treemonisha, she notes that he "plunged feverishly into the task of orchestrating his opera, day and night, with his friend Sam Patterson standing by to copy out the parts, page by page, as each page of the full score was completed."

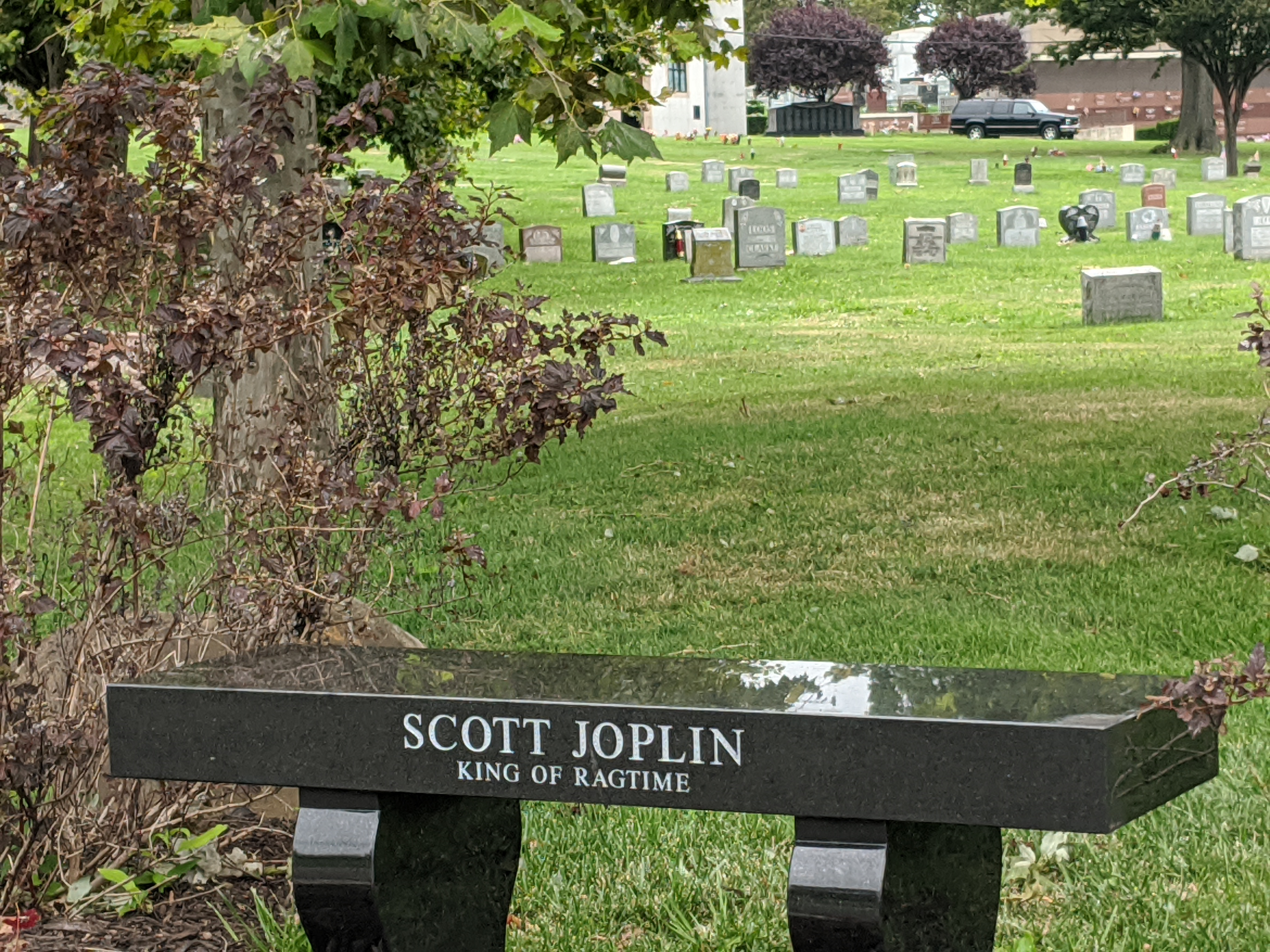
Scott Joplin Memorial

By 1916, Joplin had developed tertiary syphilis, or, more specifically, neurosyphilis. On February 2, 1917, he was admitted to Manhattan State Hospital, a mental institution. The "King of Ragtime" died there on April 1 of syphilitic dementia at the age of 48 and was buried in a pauper's grave that remained unmarked for 57 years. His grave, located at St. Michael's Cemetery in East Elmhurst was finally given a marker in 1974, the year The Sting, which showcased his music, won Best Picture at the Oscars.

== Works ==
Maple Leaf Rag

The Entertainer

The combination of classical music, the musical atmosphere present around Texarkana (including work songs, gospel hymns, spirituals and dance music), and Joplin's natural ability have been cited as contributing to the invention of ragtime: a new style that blended African-American musical styles with European forms and melodies and first became celebrated in the 1890s .

When Joplin was learning the piano, serious musical circles condemned ragtime because of its association with the vulgar and inane songs "cranked out by the tune-smiths of Tin Pan Alley". As a composer, Joplin refined ragtime, elevating it above the low and unrefined form played by the "wandering honky-tonk pianists ... playing mere dance music" of popular imagination. This new art form, the classic rag, combined Afro-American folk music's syncopation and 19th-century European romanticism, with its harmonic schemes and its march-like tempos. In the words of one critic: "Ragtime was basically...an Afro-American version of the polka, or its analog, the Sousa-style march." With this as a foundation, Joplin intended his compositions to be played exactly as he wrote them—without improvisation. Joplin wrote his rags as "classical" music in miniature form in order to raise ragtime above its "cheap bordello" origins and produced work that opera historian Elise Kirk described as "more tuneful, contrapuntal, infectious, and harmonically colorful than any others of his era".

Some speculate that Joplin's achievements were influenced by his classically trained German music teacher Julius Weiss, who may have brought a polka rhythmic sensibility from the old country to the 11-year-old Joplin. As Curtis put it, "The educated German could open up the door to a world of learning and music of which young Joplin was largely unaware."

Joplin's first and most significant hit, the "Maple Leaf Rag", was described as the archetype of the classic rag and influenced subsequent rag composers for at least 12 years after its initial publication, thanks to its rhythmic patterns, melody lines, and harmony, though with the exception of Joseph Lamb and James Scott, they generally failed to enlarge upon it. Joplin used the Maple Leaf Rag as inspiration for subsequent works, such as The Cascades in 1903, Leola in 1905, Gladiolus Rag in 1907, and Sugar Cane Rag in 1908. While he used similar harmonic and melodic patterns, the later compositions were not simple copies but were distinctly new works, which used dissonance, chromatic sections and the blues third.

=== Treemonisha ===
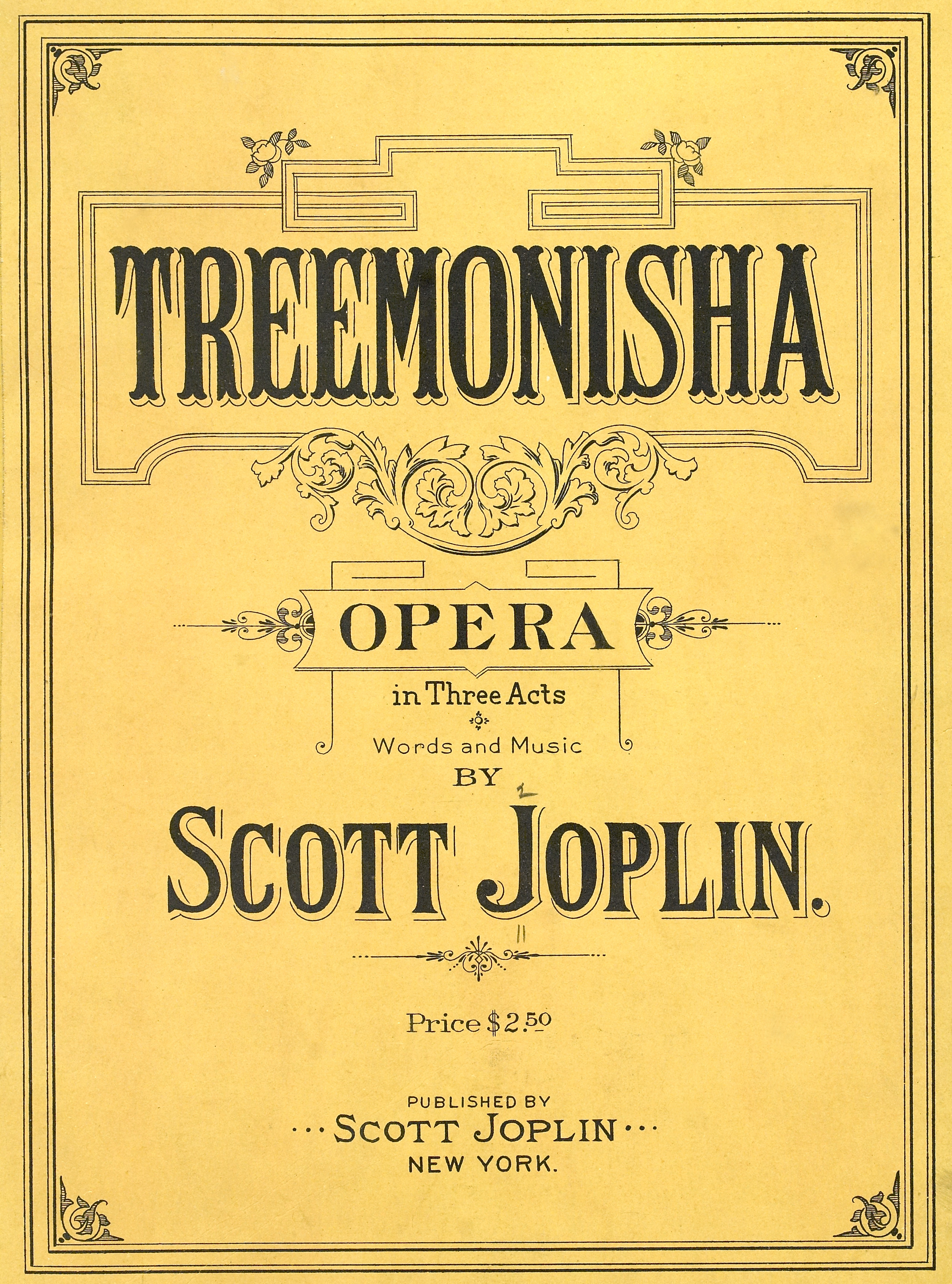
Treemonisha (1911)

The opera's setting is a former slave community in an isolated forest near Joplin's childhood town Texarkana in September 1884. The plot centers on an 18-year-old woman Treemonisha who is taught to read by a white woman and then leads her community against the influence of conjurers who prey on ignorance and superstition. Treemonisha is abducted and is about to be thrown into a wasps' nest when her friend Remus rescues her. The community realizes the value of education and the liability of their ignorance before choosing her as their teacher and leader.

Joplin wrote both the score and the libretto for the opera, which largely follows the form of European opera with many conventional arias, ensembles and choruses. In addition, the themes of superstition and mysticism evident in Treemonisha are common in the operatic tradition, and certain aspects of the plot echo devices in the work of the German composer Richard Wagner (of which Joplin was aware). A sacred tree that Treemonisha sits beneath recalls the tree that Siegmund takes his enchanted sword from in Die Walküre, and the retelling of the heroine's origins echos aspects of the opera Siegfried. In addition, African-American folk tales also influence the story—the wasp nest incident is similar to the story of Br'er Rabbit and the briar patch.

Treemonisha is not a ragtime opera—because Joplin employed the styles of ragtime and other black music sparingly, using them to convey "racial character" and to celebrate the music of his childhood at the end of the 19th century. The opera has been seen as a valuable record of rural black music from late 19th century, re-created by a "skilled and sensitive participant".

Berlin speculates about parallels between the plot and Joplin's own life. He notes that Lottie Joplin (the composer's third wife) saw a connection between the character Treemonisha's wish to lead her people out of ignorance and a similar desire in the composer. In addition, it has been speculated that Treemonisha represents Freddie, Joplin's second wife, because the date of the opera's setting was likely to have been the month of her birth.

At the time of the opera's publication in 1911, the American Musician and Art Journal praised it as "an entirely new form of operatic art". Later critics have also praised the opera as occupying a special place in American history, with its heroine "a startlingly early voice for modern civil rights causes, notably the importance of education and knowledge to African American advancement". Curtis's conclusion is similar: "In the end, Treemonisha offered a celebration of literacy, learning, hard work, and community solidarity as the best formula for advancing the race." Berlin describes it as a "fine opera, certainly more interesting than most operas then being written in the United States", but later states that Joplin's own libretto showed the composer "was not a competent dramatist", with the book not up to the quality of the music.

As Rick Benjamin, the founder and director of the Paragon Ragtime Orchestra, found out, Joplin succeeded in performing Treemonisha for paying audiences in Bayonne, New Jersey, in 1913.

=== Performance skills ===
"Pleasant Moments – Ragtime Waltz" – played by Scott Joplin (April 1916)
April 1916 piano roll recording of Scott Joplin – thought lost until discovered by a collector in New Zealand in 2006

"Maple Leaf Rag" – played by Scott Joplin (June 1916)
June 1916 piano roll recording of Scott Joplin for The Aeolian Company

Joplin's skills as a pianist were described in glowing terms by a Sedalia newspaper in 1898, and fellow ragtime composers Arthur Marshall and Joe Jordan both said that he played the instrument well. However, the son of publisher John Stark stated that Joplin was a rather mediocre pianist and that he composed on paper, rather than at the piano. Artie Matthews recalled the "delight" the St. Louis players took in outplaying Joplin.

While Joplin never made an audio recording, his playing is preserved on seven piano rolls for use in mechanical player pianos. All seven were made in 1916. Of these, the six released under the Connorized label show evidence of editing to correct the performance to strict rhythm and add embellishments, probably by the staff musicians at Connorized. Berlin theorizes that by the time Joplin reached St. Louis, he may have experienced discoordination of the fingers, tremors, and an inability to speak clearly—all symptoms of the syphilis that killed him in 1917. Biographer Blesh described the second roll recording of "Maple Leaf Rag" on the UniRecord label from June 1916 as "shocking...disorganized and completely distressing to hear". While there is disagreement among piano-roll experts as to how much of this is due to the relatively primitive recording and production techniques of the time, Berlin notes that the "Maple Leaf Rag" roll was likely to be the truest record of Joplin's playing at the time. The roll, however, may not reflect his abilities earlier in life.

== Legacy ==
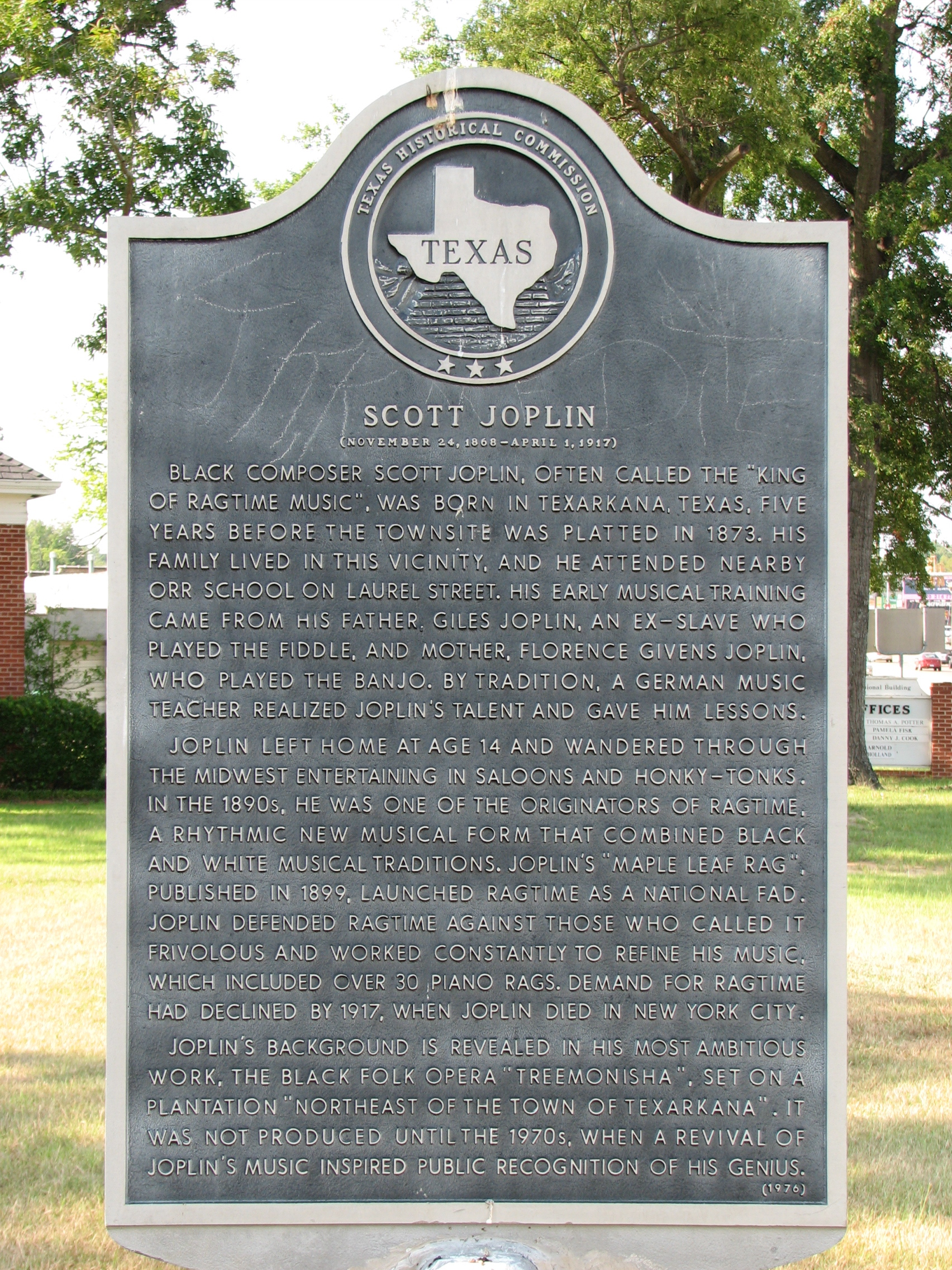
A commemorative plaque to Joplin in Texas

Joplin and his fellow ragtime composers rejuvenated American popular music, fostering an appreciation for African American music among European Americans by creating exhilarating and liberating dance tunes. "Its syncopation and rhythmic drive gave it a vitality and freshness attractive to young urban audiences indifferent to Victorian proprieties...Joplin's ragtime expressed the intensity and energy of a modern urban America."

Joshua Rifkin, a leading Joplin recording artist, wrote, "A pervasive sense of lyricism infuses his work, and even at his most high-spirited, he cannot repress a hint of melancholy or adversity...He had little in common with the fast and flashy school of ragtime that grew up after him." Joplin historian Bill Ryerson adds that "In the hands of authentic practitioners like Joplin, ragtime was a disciplined form capable of astonishing variety and subtlety...Joplin did for the rag what Chopin did for the mazurka. His style ranged from tones of torment to stunning serenades that incorporated the bolero and the tango." Biographer Susan Curtis wrote that Joplin's music had helped to "revolutionise American music and culture" by removing Victorian restraint.

Composer and actor Max Morath found it striking that the vast majority of Joplin's work did not enjoy the popularity of the "Maple Leaf Rag", because while the compositions were of increasing lyrical beauty and delicate syncopation, they remained obscure and unheralded during his life. According to music historian Ian Whitcomb, Joplin apparently realized that his music was ahead of its time:

[Joplin] opined that "Maple Leaf Rag" would make him "King of Ragtime Composers" but he also knew that he would not be a pop hero in his own lifetime. "When I'm dead twenty-five years, people are going to recognize me", he told a friend.

Just over thirty years later he was recognized, and later historian Rudi Blesh wrote a large book about ragtime, which he dedicated to the memory of Joplin.

Although he was penniless and disappointed at the end of his life, Joplin set the standard for ragtime compositions and played a key role in the development of ragtime music. While ragtime's popularity faded around then, New Orleans jazz, stride, and novelty piano subsequently adopted many of its traits. And as a pioneer composer and performer, he helped pave the way for young black artists to reach American audiences of all races. After his death, jazz historian Floyd Levin noted: "Those few who realized his greatness bowed their heads in sorrow. This was the passing of the king of all ragtime writers, the man who gave America a genuine native music."

== Revival ==
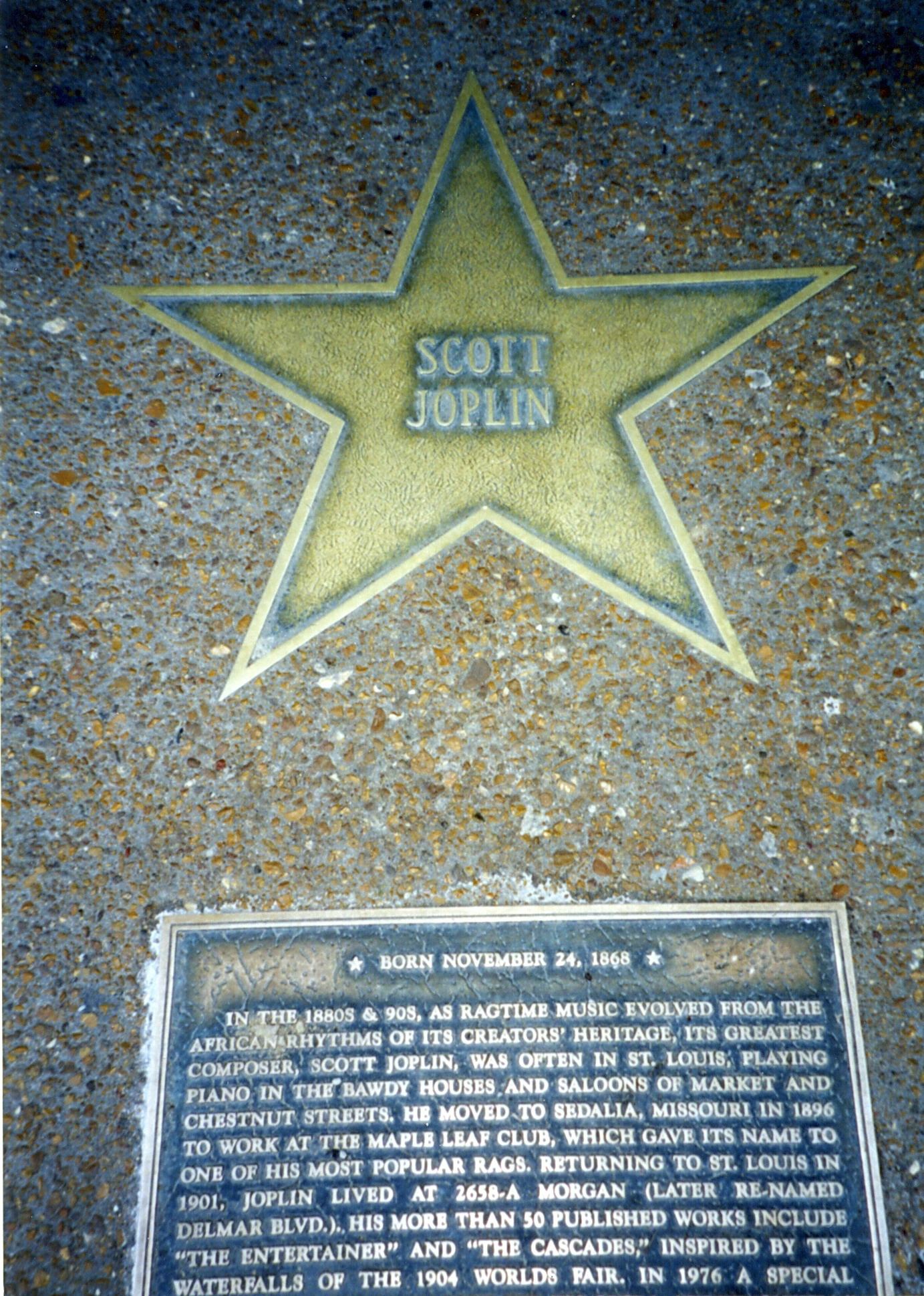
Joplin's star on the St. Louis Walk of Fame

Recordings of Joplin compositions were released by Tommy Dorsey in 1936, Jelly Roll Morton in 1939, and J. Russel Robinson in 1947. "Maple Leaf Rag" was the Joplin piece found most often on 78 rpm records.

In the 1960s, a small-scale reawakening of interest in classical ragtime was underway among some American music scholars, such as Trebor Tichenor, William Bolcom, William Albright, and Rudi Blesh. Audiophile Records released a two-record set, The Complete Piano Works of Scott Joplin, The Greatest of Ragtime Composers, performed by Knocky Parker, in 1970.

In 1968, Bolcom and Albright interested Joshua Rifkin, a young musicologist, in the body of Joplin's work. Together, they hosted an occasional ragtime-and-early-jazz evening on WBAI radio. In November 1970, Rifkin released a recording called Scott Joplin: Piano Rags on the classical label Nonesuch. It sold 100,000 copies in its first year and eventually became Nonesuch's first million-selling record. The Billboard Best-Selling Classical LPs chart for September 28, 1974, has the record at number 5, with the follow-up "Volume 2" at number 4, and a combined set of both volumes at number 3. Separately, both volumes had been on the chart for 64 weeks. In the top seven spots on that chart, six of the entries were recordings of Joplin's work, three of which were Rifkin's. Record stores found themselves for the first time putting ragtime in the classical music section. The album was nominated in 1971 for two Grammy Award categories: Best Album Notes and Best Instrumental Soloist Performance (without orchestra). Rifkin was also under consideration for a third Grammy for a recording not related to Joplin, but at the ceremony on March 14, 1972, Rifkin did not win in any category. He did a tour in 1974, which included appearances on BBC Television and a sell-out concert at London's Royal Festival Hall. In 1979, Alan Rich wrote in the magazine New York that by giving artists like Rifkin the opportunity to put Joplin's music on disc, Nonesuch Records "created, almost alone, the Scott Joplin revival".

In January 1971, Harold C. Schonberg, music critic at The New York Times, having just heard the Rifkin album, wrote a featured Sunday edition article titled "Scholars, Get Busy on Scott Joplin!" Schonberg's call to action has been described as the catalyst for classical music scholars, the sort of people Joplin had battled all his life, to conclude that Joplin was a genius. Vera Brodsky Lawrence of the New York Public Library published a two-volume set of Joplin works in June 1971, titled The Collected Works of Scott Joplin, stimulating a wider interest in the performance of Joplin's music.

In mid-February 1973, under the direction of Gunther Schuller, the New England Conservatory Ragtime Ensemble recorded an album of Joplin's rags taken from the period collection Standard High-Class Rags titled Joplin: The Red Back Book. The album won a Grammy Award as Best Chamber Music Performance in that year and became Billboard magazine's Top Classical Album of 1974. The group subsequently recorded two more albums for Golden Crest Records: More Scott Joplin Rags in 1974 and The Road From Rags To Jazz in 1975.

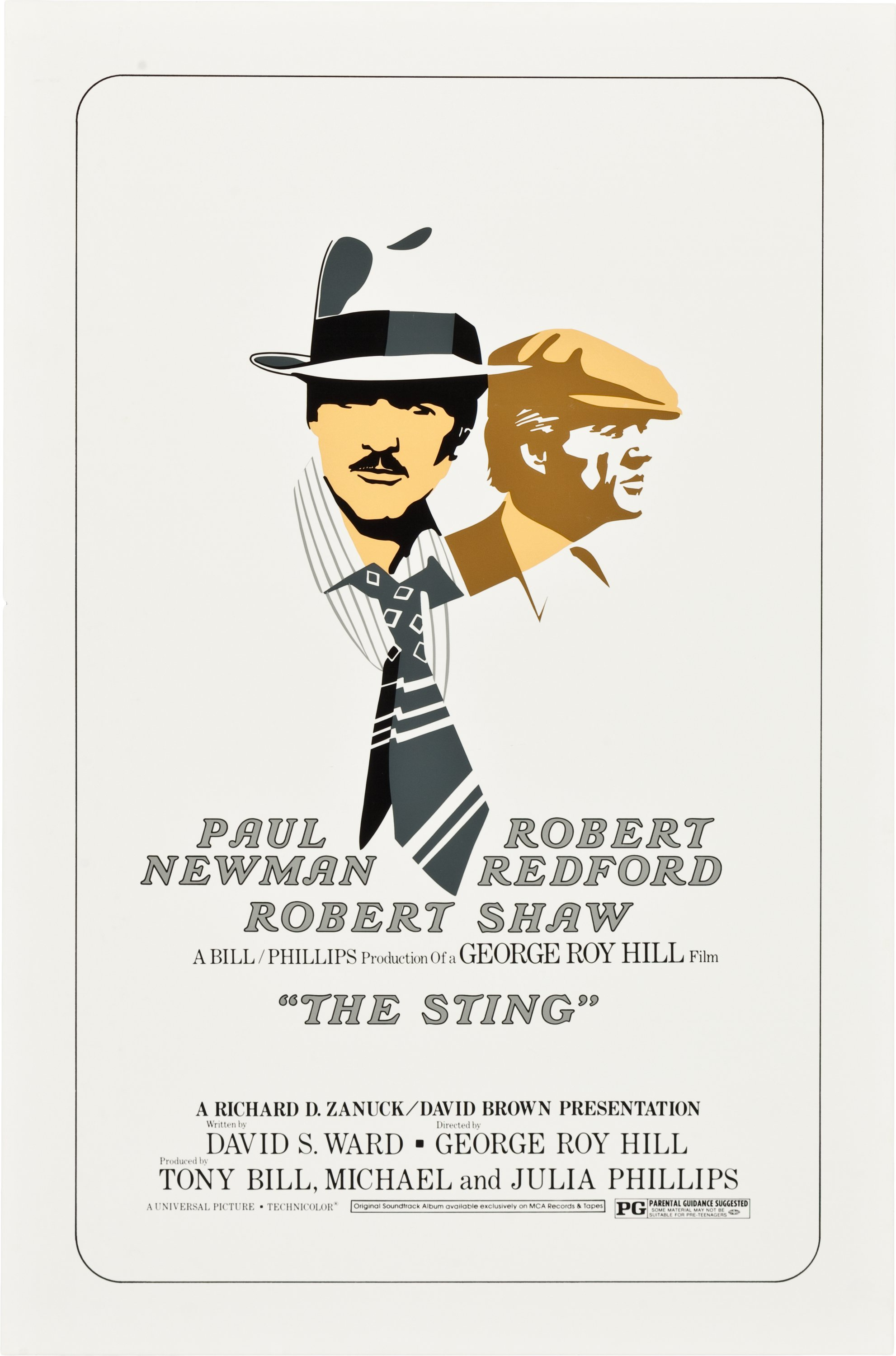
Cover of the 1973 film The Sting, which featured Joplin's music

In 1973, film producer George Roy Hill contacted Schuller and Rifkin separately, asking both men to write the score for a film project he was working on: The Sting. Both men turned down the request because of previous commitments. Instead, Hill found Marvin Hamlisch available and brought him into the project as composer. Hamlisch lightly adapted Joplin's music for The Sting, for which he won an Academy Award for Best Original Song Score and Adaptation on April 2, 1974. His version of "The Entertainer" reached number 3 on the Billboard Hot 100 and the American Top 40 music chart on May 18, 1974, prompting The New York Times to write, "The whole nation has begun to take notice." Because of the film and its score, Joplin's work became appreciated in both the popular and classical music world, becoming (in the words of music magazine Record World) the "classical phenomenon of the decade". Rifkin later said of the film soundtrack that Hamlisch lifted his piano adaptations directly from Rifkin's style and his band adaptations from Schuller's style. Schuller said Hamlisch "got the Oscar for music he didn't write (since it is by Joplin) and arrangements he didn't write, and 'editions' he didn't make. A lot of people were upset by that, but that's show biz!"

On October 22, 1971, excerpts from Treemonisha were presented in concert form at Lincoln Center, with musical performances by Bolcom, Rifkin and Mary Lou Williams supporting a group of singers. Finally, on January 28, 1972, T.J. Anderson's orchestration of Treemonisha was staged for two consecutive nights, sponsored by the Afro-American Music Workshop of Morehouse College in Atlanta, with singers accompanied by the Atlanta Symphony Orchestra under the direction of Robert Shaw, and choreography by Katherine Dunham. Schonberg remarked in February 1972 that the "Scott Joplin Renaissance" was in full swing and still growing. In May 1975, Treemonisha was staged in a full opera production by the Houston Grand Opera. The company toured briefly, then settled into an eight-week run in New York on Broadway at the Palace Theatre in October and November. This appearance was directed by Gunther Schuller, and soprano Carmen Balthrop alternated with Kathleen Battle as the title character. An "original Broadway cast" recording was produced. Because of the lack of national exposure given to the brief Morehouse College staging of the opera in 1972, many Joplin scholars wrote that the Houston Grand Opera's 1975 show was the first full production.

1974 saw the Birmingham Royal Ballet under director Kenneth MacMillan create Elite Syncopations, a ballet based on tunes by Joplin and other composers of the era. That year also brought the premiere by the Los Angeles Ballet of Red Back Book, choreographed by John Clifford to Joplin rags from the collection of the same name, including both solo piano performances and arrangements for full orchestra.

Copyright attorney Alvin Deutsch worked with Vera Brodsky Lawrence to make sure the Joplin estate owned the rights to his work. Deutsch negotiated with New York Public Library to get Treemonisha copyright and got the Joplin estate $60,000 in the 1970s when someone infringed on that copyright. Their work helped to mount the show Treemonisha via Dramatic Publishing.

== Museum ==
The home Joplin rented in St. Louis from 1900 to 1903 was recognized as a National Historic Landmark in 1976 and was saved from destruction by the local African American community. In 1983, the Missouri Department of Natural Resources made it the first state historic site in Missouri dedicated to African American heritage. At first it focused entirely on Joplin and ragtime music, ignoring the urban milieu which shaped his musical compositions. A newer heritage project has expanded coverage to include the more complex social history of black urban migration and the transformation of a multi-ethnic neighborhood to the contemporary community. Part of this diverse narrative now includes coverage of uncomfortable topics of racial oppression, poverty, sanitation, prostitution, and sexually transmitted diseases.

== Other awards and recognition ==
- 1970: Joplin was inducted into the Songwriters Hall of Fame by the National Academy of Popular Music.
- 1976: Joplin was awarded a special Pulitzer Prize "bestowed posthumously in this Bicentennial Year, for his contributions to American music".
- 1977: Motown Productions produced Scott Joplin, a biographical film starring Billy Dee Williams as Joplin, released by Universal Pictures.
- 1983: the United States Postal Service issued a stamp of the composer as part of its Black Heritage commemorative series.
- 1989: Joplin received a star on the St. Louis Walk of Fame.
- 2002: a collection of Joplin's own performances recorded on piano rolls in the 1900s (decade) was included by the National Recording Preservation Board in the Library of Congress National Recording Registry. The board annually selects songs that are "culturally, historically, or aesthetically significant".
- 2012: a crater on the planet Mercury was named in his honor.
- 2016: Joplin, an open-source note-taking application for desktop and mobile, was named after Scott Joplin.
- 2026: Joplin received posthumous honorary life membership by Barbershop Harmony Society.

== Footnotes ==
=== Sources ===
==== Books ====
- Blesh, Rudi. "Scott Joplin: Black-American Classicist". In Lawrence (1971).
- Berlin, Edward A. (1994). King of Ragtime: Scott Joplin and His Era. Oxford University Press. ISBN 0-19-510108-1 – via Internet Archive.
- Crawford, Richard (2001). America's Musical Life: A History. W. W. Norton & Co. ISBN 0-393-04810-1.
- Curtis, Susan (1999). Christensen, Lawrence O. (ed.). Dictionary of Missouri Biography. University of Missouri Press. ISBN 0-8262-1222-0.
- Curtis, Susan (2004). Dancing to a Black Man's Tune: A Life of Scott Joplin. University of Missouri Press. ISBN 0-8262-1547-5.
- Davis, Francis (1995). The History of the Blues: The Roots, the Music, the People. Hyperion. ISBN 0-306-81296-7.
- Howat, Roy (1986). Debussy in Proportion: A Musical Analysis. Cambridge University Press. ISBN 0-521-31145-4.
- Jasen, David A.; Tichenor, Trebor Jay (1978). Rags and Ragtime: A Musical History. New York: Dover Publications. p. 88. ISBN 0-486-25922-6.
- Jasen, David A. "Discography of 78 rpm Records of Joplin Works". In Lawrence (1971).
- Kirk, Elise Kuhl (2001). American Opera. University of Illinois Press. ISBN 0-252-02623-3 – via Internet Archive.
- Lawrence, Vera Brodsky, ed. (1971). Scott Joplin Complete Piano Works. New York Public Library. ISBN 0-87104-242-8.
- Levin, Floyd (2002). Classic Jazz: A Personal View of the Music and the Musicians. University of California Press. ISBN 978-0-520-23463-5.
- McElhone, Kevin (2004). Mechanical Music (2 ed.). Osprey Publishing. ISBN 0-7478-0578-4.
- Morath, Max (2005). Kirchner, Bill (ed.). The Oxford Companion to Jazz. Oxford University Press. ISBN 0-19-518359-2.
- Philip, Robert (1998). Rowland, David (ed.). The Cambridge Companion to the Piano. Cambridge Companions to Music (illustrated, reprint ed.). Cambridge University Press. ISBN 0-521-47986-X.
- Ping-Robbins, Nancy R. (1998). Scott Joplin: a guide to research. Psychology Press. ISBN 0-8240-8399-7.
- Ryerson, Bill; Joplin, Scott (1973). Best of Scott Joplin: a Collection of Original Ragtime Piano Compositions. C. Hansen Music and Books. ISBN 0-8494-0581-5.
- Scott, William B.; Rutkoff, Peter M. (2001). New York Modern: The Arts and the City. Johns Hopkins University Press. ISBN 0-8018-6793-2.
- Siepmann, Jeremy (1998). The Piano: The Complete Illustrated Guide to the World's Most Popular Musical Instrument. Hal Leonard Corporation. ISBN 0-7935-9976-8.
- Waldo, Terry (1976). This Is Ragtime. New York: Hawthorn Books, Inc. ISBN 0-8015-7618-0.
- Whitcomb, Ian (1986). After the Ball. Hal Leonard Corp. ISBN 0-87910-063-X.
- Williams, Martin, ed. (1987). The Smithsonian Collection of Classic Jazz. Smithsonian Institution Press. ISBN 0-393-99342-6.

==== Web pages ====
- Berlin, Edward A. (1998). "A Biography of Scott Joplin". The Scott Joplin International Ragtime Foundation. Archived from the original on February 24, 2007.
- Berlin, Edward A. (2012). "Scott Joplin: Brief Biographical Sketch". Edward A. Berlin. Archived from the original on February 1, 2013.
- Edwards, "Perfessor" Bill (2008). "Rags & Pieces by Scott Joplin, 1895–1905". Archived from the original on June 6, 2009.
- Edwards, "Perfessor" Bill (2010). "'Perfessor' Bill's guide to notable Ragtime Era Composers". Archived from the original on September 27, 2011.
- ESPER. "Black Heritage Stamp issues". Ebony Society of Philatelic Reflections.
- RedHotJazz. "Wilbur Sweatman and His Band".
- St. Louis Walk of Fame. "Inductees to the St. Louis Walk of Fame". St. Louis Walk of Fame. Archived from the original on October 31, 2012.

==== Journals and magazines ====
- Albrecht, Theodore (Fall 1979). "Julius Weiss: Scott Joplin's First Piano Teacher". College Music Symposium. 19 (2): 89–105. JSTOR 40374020.
- Anon. (September 28, 1974a). "Best Selling Classical LPs". Billboard. p. 61.
- Anon. (May 18, 1974b). "Hot 100". Billboard. p. 64.
- Rich, Alan (1979). "Music". New York. No. December 24, 1979. p. 81.
