= Euday L. Bowman =

American pianist and composer (1886–1949)

Euday Louis Bowman
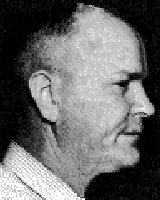

Background information
- Born: November 9, 1886; Fort Worth, Texas, U.S.
- Died: May 26, 1949 (aged 62) New York City, U.S.
- Genres: Ragtime
- Occupations: Composer, performer
- Instrument: Piano

Euday Louis Bowman (November 9, 1886 – May 26, 1949) was an American pianist and composer of ragtime and blues who represented the style of Texas Ragtime. He is chiefly remembered as the composer of the highly popular "Twelfth Street Rag", a ragtime composition from 1914 out of a series of rags that Bowman wrote during or after a period in which he worked as a pianist in bordellos of Kansas City. These pieces, including "Sixth Street Rag", "Tenth Street Rag", "Eleventh Street Rag" and "Twelfth Street Rag," were named after streets of Fort Worth's redlight district.

== Biography ==
Euday Bowman was the paternal descendant of an early 18th-century German immigrant named Baumann. Three of Bowman's relatives fought in the American Revolution, including two cousins and one direct ancestor. Though several books list Bowman's birth year according to a tradition as 1887, official records show his birthdate as November 9, 1886. He was born and lived in what was then a village in Tarrant County, TX. The area, originally named Bowman Springs (according to some sources Bowman Spring) after his grandfather, Isaac Gatewood Bowman (1820–1907), was renamed Webb around 1895. The origin of the Webb name is unknown. It is now a suburb in the southeast area of Arlington. Bowman's parents divorced when he was young and his mother moved the family to Fort Worth. Both his mother and sister were piano teachers.

A contemporary of Bowman, the ragtime pianist and composer Brun Campbell, published erroneous remarks about Bowman that were subsequently spread in other published narratives. Contrary to Campbell's claims, Bowman did not lose a leg and did not die without heirs. In fact, when Brun wrote that, 24 claimants were involved in a lawsuit establishing the legitimate heirs. Although many sources indicate Bowman lost a leg when he tried to hop a train, that event happened to his cousin and resulted in a lawsuit ultimately decided by the Texas Supreme Court.

In his teens and early twenties, Bowman traveled around as pianist, and was also an arranger for popular orchestras. He lived together with his sister, Miss Mary M. Bowman, who wrote a part of Twelfth Street Rag. Bowman sold the copyright to the song for just $100. Many years later he regained the copyright, having lost out on the royalties earned by the publisher through the many successful interpretations of that rag by artists like Louis Armstrong (1927), Bennie Moten (1927), Duke Ellington (1931), and Pee Wee Hunt (1948). Other works of his include Petticoat Lane Rag, Colorado Blues, Kansas City Blues, Fort Worth Blues, Tipperary Blues, Shamrock Rag, White Lily Dreams, and Old Glory On Its Way.

== Claim of Royalties ==
Euday had no children, so the royalties went to his sister. Upon her death one year later, Ed G. Max was appointed temporary administrator for her estate. His siblings, Charlotte Goldman and husband and Harry Loyd Max, filed their opposition to Mary Bowman's will, and alleged that they, with Ed G. Max, their brother, were nephews and niece of Mary M. Bowman and were all and the only heirs to her estate. An intervention was filed by Forrest Campbell and twenty-one others, asserting they were cousins of Mary M. Bowman, and children of deceased cousins of Mary M. Bowman, and were the only heirs of deceased Mary M. Bowman. The cousins ultimately prevailed.

Euday Bowman's work is not public domain. Royalties remained distributed among hundreds of descendants of the cousins until 2013, when two descendants bought out the others via private auction.

== See also ==
- List of ragtime composers
