= Ragtime =

Music genre

- Stylistic origins: Cakewalks; folk; minstrel show; marches; classical; blues
- Cultural origins: Early 1890s, Midwestern and Southern United States
- Typical instruments: Mainly piano, sometimes banjo orchestra, brass band
- Derivative forms: Stride; novelty piano; jazz; honky tonk; classic rag

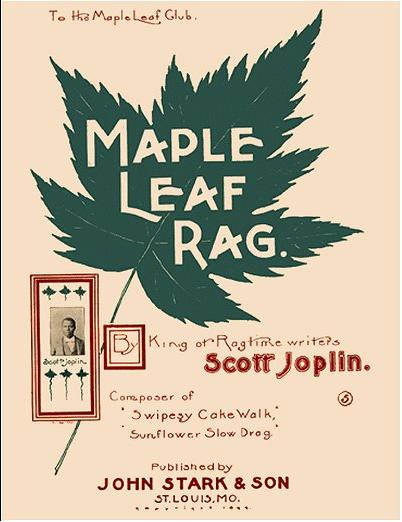
Scott Joplin achieved fame for his ragtime compositions and was dubbed the "King of Ragtime" by contemporaries. His "Maple Leaf Rag" is one of the most famous rags. Maple Leaf Rag

Ragtime, also spelled rag-time or rag time, is a musical style noted for its syncopated or "ragged" rhythm. It originated in African American communities in the late 19th century and was propelled to popularity in the 1890s to 1910s by composers such as James Scott, Joseph Lamb, and particularly Scott Joplin. Known as the "King of Ragtime", Joplin gained fame through compositions like "Maple Leaf Rag" and "The Entertainer".

The style is closely related to marches. Ragtime pieces (often called "rags") usually contain several distinct themes, often arranged in patterns of repeats and reprises. They are typically composed for and performed on the piano, though the genre has been adapted for a variety of instruments and styles. The music was initially distributed primarily through sheet music and piano rolls.

Ragtime influenced early jazz, Harlem stride piano, Piedmont blues, and early-20th-century European classical composers such as Erik Satie, Claude Debussy, and Igor Stravinsky. It was overshadowed by jazz in the 1920s, but has since experienced several revivals, notably in the 1970s, when several of Joplin's songs were adapted for the caper film The Sting.

== Etymology ==
While the word ragtime was first recorded in 1896, the term probably originates in the dance events known as "rags", hosted by enslaved black people bound to the plantation system. The first recorded use of the term ragtime was by vaudeville musician Ben Harney who in 1896 used it to describe the piano music he played and first published the year prior.

== History ==
=== Origins ===
While the precise origins of ragtime are uncertain, scholars like Terry Waldo believe it to stem from music played by plantation slaves for dance events called "rags", with further influence from European classical music, Irish jigs, and Scottish cakewalks. The musician ensemble would generally only consist of a banjo player and a fiddle player. They would play dance music like jigs, reels and schottisches, with the way the banjo is played providing the syncopation that ragtime came to be known for.

While no notated or recorded examples of music from before the 1890s survive, oral tradition and later testimony preserve a few pieces that some musicians and historians associate with what became ragtime in the mid-1890s. One frequently cited example is The Dream Rag (originally titled The Bull Dyke's Dream) by Jessie Pickett, which uses a habanera left-hand rhythm (unlike the march bass typical of later published rags). Pickett performed The Dream Rag at the 1893 Chicago World's Fair, introducing it to the greater American public. Others present at the exposition were such names as Scott Joplin, Ben Harney, and Shep Edmonds (referred to by some as the "father of ragtime"). Eubie Blake, who learned The Dream from Pickett around 1900, told Terry Waldo that it was the oldest rag he knew and recalled that Pickett believed it dated to sometime before the American Civil War.

Another surviving example sometimes cited as anticipating ragtime is the music of Louis Moreau Gottschalk (1829–1869). Early works such as Bamboula employ the cinquillo "de-dum-de-dum-dum" syncopation that musicologist Frederick S. Starr distinguishes from the more sedate habanera rhythm ("dum-de-dum-dum"). Gottschalk drew these Creole melodies from the French Caribbean repertoire of his Saint-Domingue family. Starr concludes that claims Congo Square was the source have "not a shred of evidence." (Note: Starr traces the Congo Square claim to a promotional pamphlet by Edward Henry Durell (1853) and more decisively to George Washington Cable's 1886 Century Magazine article "The Dance in Place Congo." Cable obtained song material from Gottschalk's sister Clara but "failed to note that these songs had no known connection with Congo Square.")

An earlier example of music anticipating the rhythmic characteristics of ragtime appears in Ludwig van Beethoven's Piano Sonata No. 32 in C minor, Op. 111, composed in 1821–1822. The third variation of the sonata's second movement, the Arietta, features pronounced syncopation and offbeat accents that have drawn comparisons to ragtime, jazz, and boogie-woogie, more than seven decades before ragtime emerged as a distinct musical genre.

The composed ragtime of the 1890s had its origins in African American communities of the Mississippi Valley in general and St. Louis in particular. Most of the early ragtime musicians could not read or notate music, but instead played by ear and improvised. The instrument of choice by ragtime musicians during this time was usually a banjo or a piano. It was performed in brothels, bars, saloons, and informal gatherings at house parties or juke joints. These places were an excellent breeding ground for new music as European classical music was mixed with African-American folk songs.

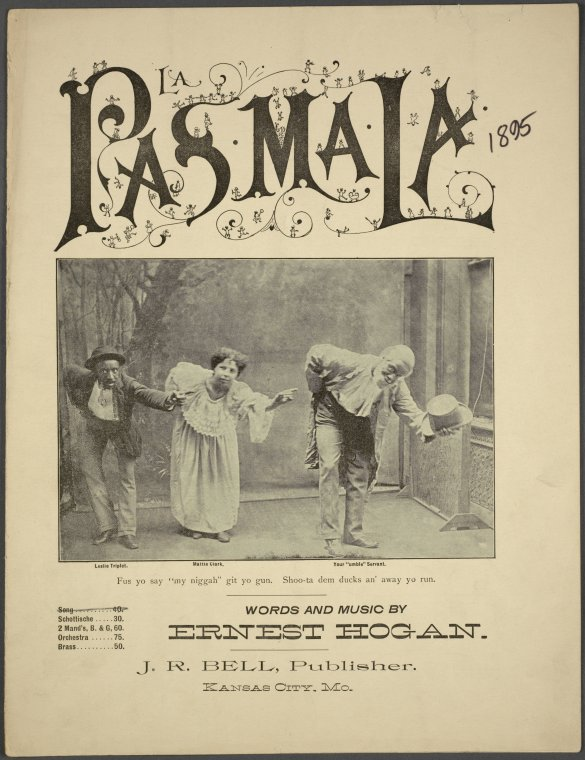
Cover for "La Pas Ma La" sheet music (1895). Words and music by Ernest Hogan.

The earliest published ragtime composition appeared in 1895. Kentucky native Ben Harney's "You've Been a Good Old Wagon But You Done Broke Down" had its copyright registered in January 1895 by Greenup Music Co. in Louisville; Harney's song became a significant early hit that helped popularize the genre to mainstream audiences. In September 1895, Minstrel comedian Ernest Hogan registered copyright for "La Pas Ma La"; it is often mistakenly cited as the earliest published ragtime work by a Black composer, but Edward A. Berlin noted that "the bass is in the habanera style, the melody lacks the rhythms later associated with ragtime." In 1896, a coon song, "All Coons Look Alike to Me", was released by Hogan with a 'rag' accompaniment by Max Hoffman. Per Berlin, instrumental ragtime "emerged fully" in 1897 with the publication of around a dozen syncopated pieces. Another early ragtime pioneer was comedian and songwriter Irving Jones.

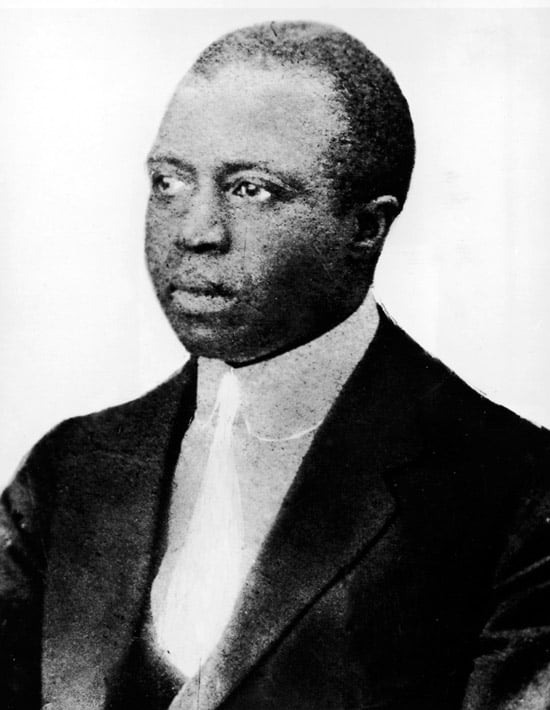
Scott Joplin, considered the "King of Ragtime" (1912)

Ragtime was also a modification of the march style popularized by John Philip Sousa, with a steady bass accompaniment in the left hand supporting a syncopated melody in the right. Jazz critic Rudi Blesh thought its polyrhythm may be coming from African music, although no historian or musicologist has made any connection with any music from Africa.

Ragtime composer Scott Joplin (ca. 1868–1917) from Texas, became famous through the publication of the "Maple Leaf Rag" (1899) and a string of ragtime hits such as "The Entertainer" (1902), although he was later forgotten by all but a small, dedicated community of ragtime aficionados until the major ragtime revival in the early 1970s. For at least 12 years after its publication, "Maple Leaf Rag" heavily influenced subsequent ragtime composers with its melody lines, chord progressions or metric patterns.

In a 1913 interview published in the black newspaper New York Age, Scott Joplin asserted that there had been "ragtime music in America ever since the Negro race has been here, but the white people took no notice of it until about twenty years ago [in the 1890s]."

=== The heyday of ragtime ===
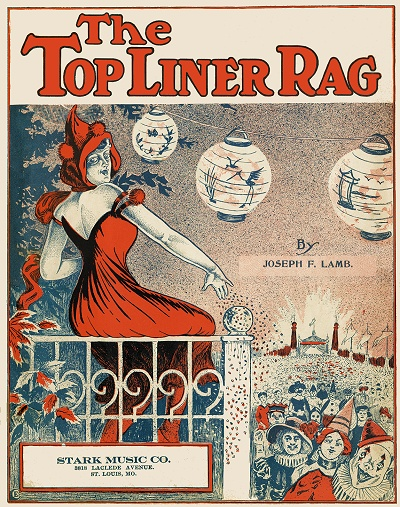
Joseph Lamb's 1916 "The Top Liner Rag"

Ragtime quickly established itself as a distinctly American form of popular music. Ragtime became some of the first American music to have an impact on mainstream popular culture. Piano "professors" such as Jelly Roll Morton played ragtime in the "sporting houses" (bordellos) of New Orleans. Polite society embraced ragtime as disseminated by brass bands and "society" dance bands. Bands led by W. C. Handy and James R. Europe were among the first to crash the color bar in American music. The new rhythms of ragtime changed the world of dance bands and led to new dance steps, popularized by the show-dancers Vernon and Irene Castle during the 1910s. The growth of dance orchestras in popular entertainment was an outgrowth of ragtime and continued into the 1920s.

Ragtime also ironically made its way to Europe. Shipboard orchestras on transatlantic lines included ragtime music in their repertoire. In 1912, the first public concerts of ragtime were performed in the United Kingdom by the American Ragtime Octette (ARO) at the Hippodrome, London; a group organized by ragtime composer and pianist Lewis F. Muir who toured Europe. Immensely popular with British audiences, the ARO popularized several of Muir's rags (such as "Waiting for the Robert E. Lee" and "Hitchy-Koo") which were credited by historian Ian Whitcomb as the first American popular songs to influence British culture and music. The ARO recorded some of Muir's rags with the British record label The Winner Records in 1912; the first ragtime recordings made in Europe. James R. Europe's 369th Regiment band generated great enthusiasm during its 1918 tour of France.

Ragtime was an influence on early jazz; the influence of Jelly Roll Morton continued in the Harlem stride piano style of players such as James P. Johnson and Fats Waller. Ragtime was also a major influence on Piedmont blues. Dance orchestras started evolving away from ragtime towards the big band sounds that predominated in the 1920s and 1930s when they adopted smoother rhythmic styles.

=== Revivals ===
There have been numerous revivals since newer styles supplanted ragtime in the 1920s. First in the early 1940s, many jazz bands began to include ragtime in their repertoire and put out ragtime recordings on 78 rpm records. A more significant revival occurred in the 1950s as a wider variety of ragtime genres of the past were made available on records, and new rags were composed, published, and recorded.

In the 1960s, two major factors brought about a greater public recognition of ragtime. The first was the 1960 publication of They All Played Ragtime by Harriet Janis and Rudi Blesh. Some historians refer to this book as "The Ragtime Bible". It was the first comprehensive and serious attempt to document the first ragtime era and its three most important composers: Joplin, Scott, and Lamb. The second factor was the rise to prominence of Max Morath, who created two television series for National Educational Television (now PBS): The Ragtime Era (1960) and The Turn of the Century (1962). Morath turned the latter into a one-man show in 1969, and toured the US with it for five years. He later created and toured other one-man shows that educated audiences about ragtime. New ragtime composers soon followed, including Morath, Donald Ashwander, Trebor Jay Tichenor, John Arpin, William Bolcom, and William Albright.

In 1971, Joshua Rifkin released a compilation of Joplin's work that was nominated for a Grammy Award.

In 1973, The New England Ragtime Ensemble (then a student group called The New England Conservatory Ragtime Ensemble) recorded The Red Back Book, a compilation of some of Joplin's rags in period orchestrations edited by conservatory president Gunther Schuller. It won a Grammy for Best Chamber Music Performance of the year and was named Top Classical Album of 1974 by Billboard magazine. The film The Sting (1973) brought ragtime to a wide audience with its soundtrack of Joplin tunes. The film's rendering of "The Entertainer", adapted and orchestrated by Marvin Hamlisch, was a Top 5 hit in 1975.

Ragtime – with Joplin's work at the forefront – has been cited as an American equivalent of the minuets of Mozart, the mazurkas of Chopin, or the waltzes of Brahms. Ragtime influenced classical composers including Erik Satie, Claude Debussy, and Igor Stravinsky.

== Historical context ==
Ragtime originated in American music in the late 19th century and descended from the jigs and march music played by European bands, referred to as "jig piano" or "piano thumping".

By the start of the 20th century, it became widely popular throughout North America and was listened and danced to, performed, and written by people of many different subcultures. A distinctly American musical style, ragtime may be considered a synthesis of African syncopation and European classical music, especially the marches made popular by John Philip Sousa.

Some early piano rags were classified as "jig", "rag", and "coon songs". These labels were sometimes used interchangeably in the mid-1890s, 1900s, and 1910s. Ragtime was also preceded by its close relative the cakewalk. In 1896, black entertainer Ernest Hogan released "All Coons Look Alike to Me", which eventually sold a million copies and helped popularize ragtime rhythms. Its use of racial slurs prompted creation of a number of imitation tunes, known as "coon songs" because of their use of racist and stereotypical images of black people. In Hogan's later years, he expressed pride in helping bring ragtime to a larger audience.

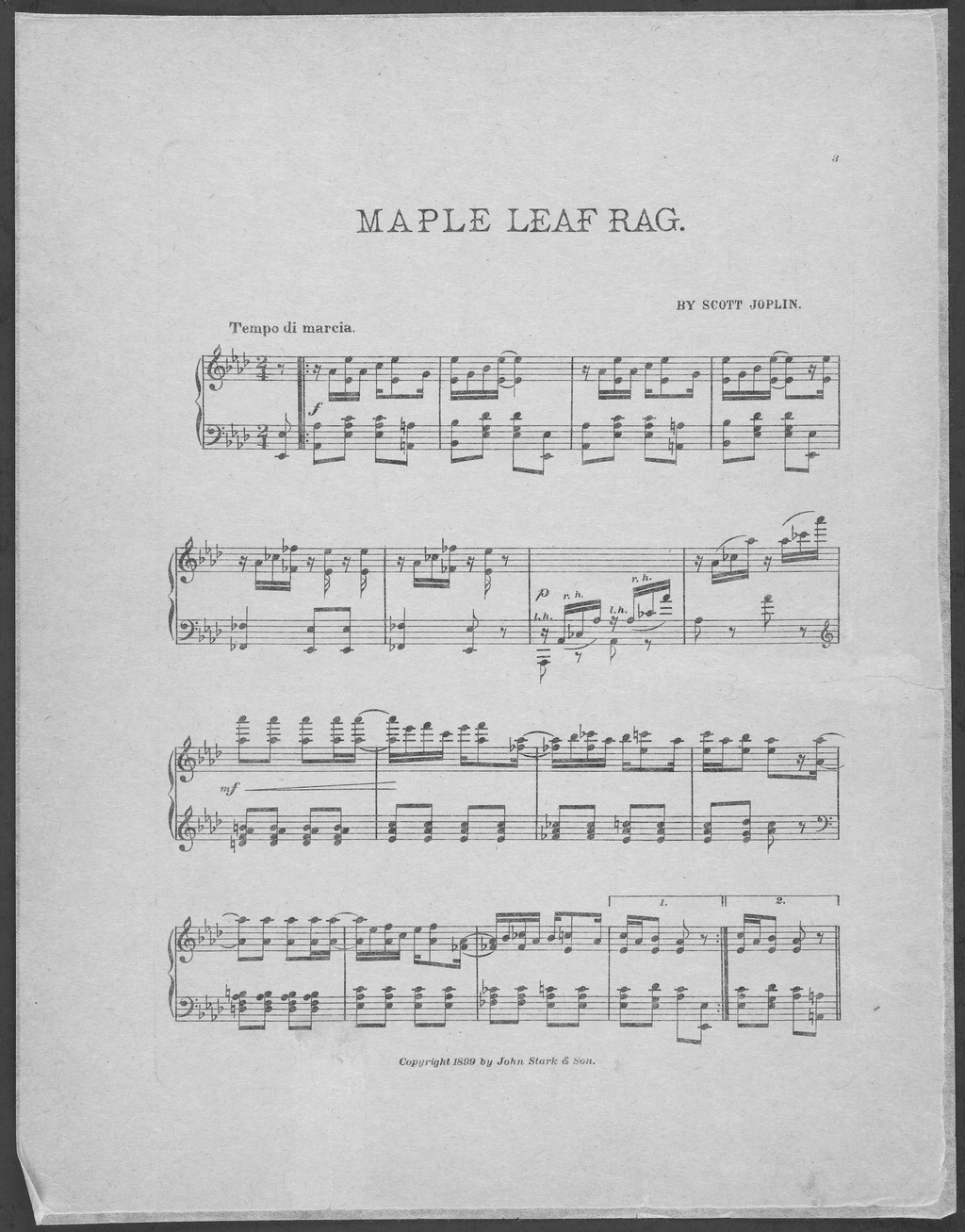
Sheet music of Joplin's 1899 "Maple Leaf Rag"

The emergence of mature ragtime is usually dated to 1897, the year in which several important early rags were published. "Harlem Rag" by Tom Turpin and "Mississippi Rag" by William Krell were both release that year. In 1899, Scott Joplin's "Maple Leaf Rag" was published and became a great hit and demonstrated more depth and sophistication than earlier ragtime.

Ragtime was one of the main influences on the early development of jazz (along with the blues). Some artists, such as Jelly Roll Morton, were present and performed both ragtime and jazz styles during the period the two styles overlapped. He also incorporated the Spanish tinge in his performances, which gave a habanera or tango rhythm to his music. Jazz largely surpassed ragtime in mainstream popularity in the early 1920s, although ragtime compositions continue to be written up to the present, and periodic revivals of popular interest in ragtime occurred in the 1950s and the 1970s.

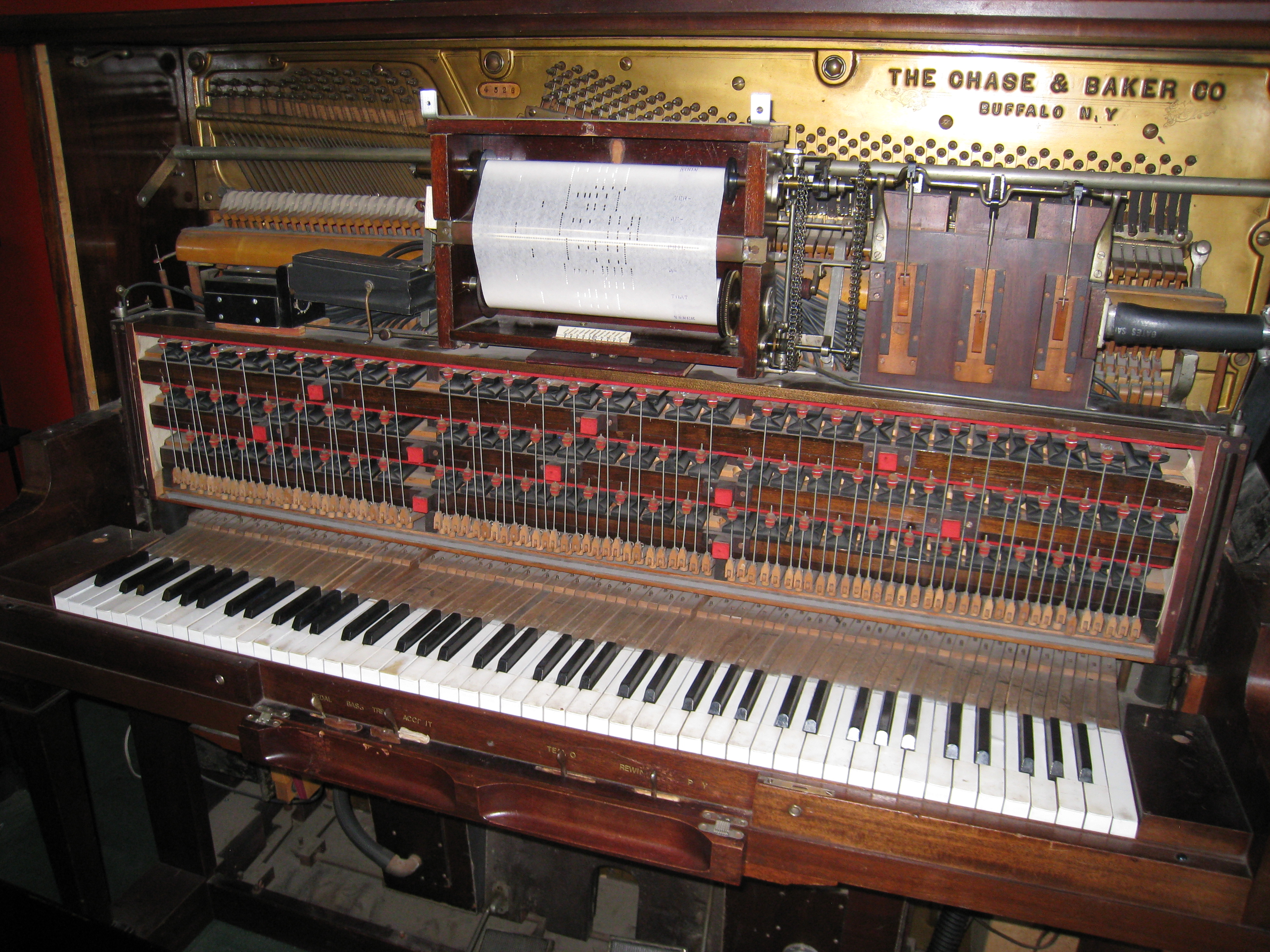
The keys of this player piano from 1885 are controlled by musical information in the center piano roll.

The heyday of ragtime occurred before sound recording was widely available. Like European classical music, classical ragtime has primarily been a written tradition distributed though sheet music. But sheet music sales ultimately depended on the skill of amateur pianists, which limited classical ragtime's complexity and proliferation. A folk ragtime tradition also existed before and during the period of classical ragtime (a designation largely created by Scott Joplin's publisher John Stillwell Stark), manifesting itself mostly through string bands, banjo and mandolin clubs (which experienced a burst of popularity during the early 20th century) and the like. Ragtime was also distributed via piano rolls for mechanical player pianos. While the traditional rag was fading in popularity, a genre called novelty piano (or novelty ragtime) emerged that took advantage of new advances in piano roll technology and the phonograph record to permit a more complex, pyrotechnic, performance-oriented style of rag to be heard. Chief among the novelty rag composers is Zez Confrey, whose "Kitten on the Keys" popularized the style in 1921.

Ragtime also served as the roots for stride piano, a more improvisational piano style popular in the 1920s and 1930s. Elements of ragtime found their way into much of the American popular music of the early 20th century. It also played a central role in the development of the musical style later referred to as Piedmont blues; indeed, much of the music played by such artists of the style as Reverend Gary Davis, Blind Boy Fuller, Elizabeth Cotten, and Etta Baker could be referred to as "ragtime guitar."

Although most ragtime was composed for piano, transcriptions for other instruments and ensembles are common, notably including Gunther Schuller's arrangements of Joplin's rags. Ragtime guitar continued to be popular into the 1930s, usually in the form of songs accompanied by skilled guitar work. Numerous records emanated from several labels, performed by Blind Blake, Blind Boy Fuller, Blind Lemon Jefferson, and others. Occasionally, ragtime was scored for ensembles (particularly dance bands and brass bands) similar to those of James Reese Europe or as songs like those written by Irving Berlin. Joplin had long-standing ambitions of synthesizing the worlds of ragtime and opera, to which end the opera Treemonisha was written. However, its first performance, poorly staged with Joplin accompanying on the piano, was "disastrous" and was never performed again in Joplin's lifetime. The score was lost for decades, then rediscovered in 1970, and a fully orchestrated and staged performance took place in 1972. An earlier opera by Joplin, A Guest of Honor, has been lost.

== Musical form ==
The rag was a modification of the march made popular by John Philip Sousa, with additional polyrhythms coming from African music. It was usually written in 2/4 or 4/4 time with a predominant left-hand pattern of bass notes on strong beats (beats 1 and 3) and chords on weak beats (beat 2 and 4) accompanying a syncopated melody in the right hand. According to some sources the name "ragtime" may come from the "ragged or syncopated rhythm" of the right hand. A rag written in 3/4 time is a "ragtime waltz".

Ragtime is not a meter in the same way that marches are in duple meter and waltzes are in triple meter; it is rather a musical style that uses an effect that can be applied to any meter. The defining characteristic of ragtime music is a specific type of syncopation in which melodic accents occur between metrical beats. This results in a melody that seems to be avoiding some metrical beats of the accompaniment by emphasizing notes that either anticipate or follow the beat ("a rhythmic base of metric affirmation, and a melody of metric denial"). The ultimate (and intended) effect on the listener is actually to accentuate the beat, thereby inducing the listener to move to the music. American composer and pianist Scott Joplin, known as the "King of Ragtime", called the effect "weird and intoxicating." He also used the term "swing" in describing how to play ragtime music: "Play slowly until you catch the swing...". The name swing later came to be applied to an early style of jazz that developed from ragtime.

Converting a non-ragtime piece of music into ragtime by changing the time values of melody notes is known as "ragging" the piece. Original ragtime pieces usually contain several distinct themes, four being the most common number. These themes were typically 16 bars, each theme divided into periods of four four-bar phrases and arranged in patterns of repeats and reprises. Typical patterns were AABBACCC', AABBCCDD and AABBCCA, with the first two strains in the tonic key and the following strains in the subdominant. Sometimes rags would include introductions of four bars or bridges, between themes, of anywhere between four and 24 bars.

In a note on the sheet music for the song "Leola" Joplin wrote, "Notice! Don't play this piece fast. It is never right to play 'ragtime' fast." E. L. Doctorow used the quotation as the epigraph to his novel Ragtime.

== Related forms and styles ==
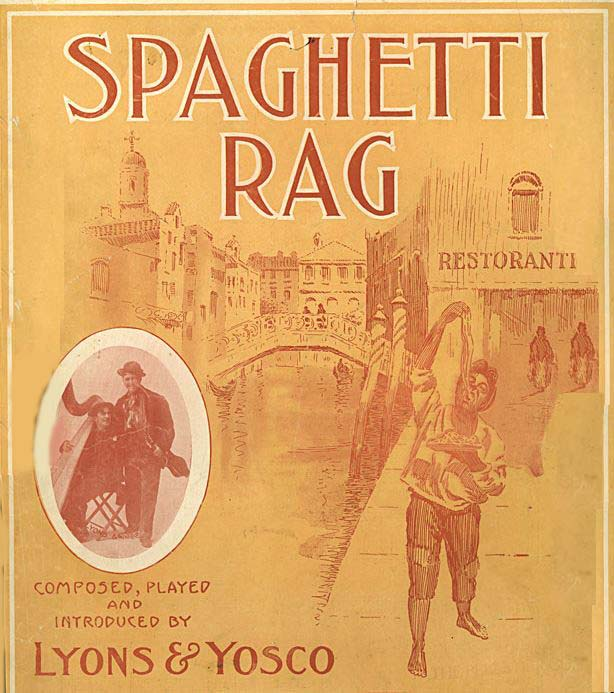
Sheet music cover for "Spaghetti Rag" (1910) by Lyons and Yosco Spaghetti Rag (1910), by Lyons and Yosco

Ragtime pieces came in a number of different styles during the years of its popularity and appeared under a number of different descriptive names. It is related to several earlier styles of music, has close ties with later styles of music, and was associated with a few musical fads of the period such as the foxtrot. Many of the terms associated with ragtime have inexact definitions and are defined differently by different experts; the definitions are muddled further by the fact that publishers often labelled pieces for the fad of the moment rather than the true style of the composition. There is even disagreement about the term "ragtime" itself; experts such as David Jasen and Trebor Tichenor choose to exclude ragtime songs from the definition but include novelty piano and stride piano (a modern perspective), while Edward A. Berlin includes ragtime songs and excludes the later styles (which is closer to how ragtime was viewed originally). The terms below should not be considered exact, but merely an attempt to pin down the general meaning of the concept.

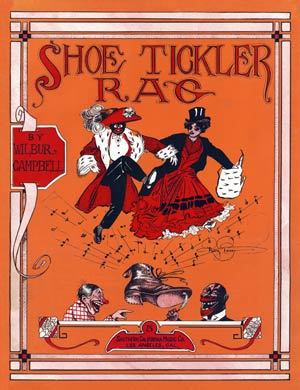
Shoe Tickler Rag, cover of the music sheet for a song from 1911 by Wilbur Campbell

- Cakewalk – a pre-ragtime dance form popular until about 1904. The music is intended to be representative of an African American dance contest in which the prize is a cake. Many early rags are cakewalks.
- Characteristic march – a march incorporating idiomatic touches (such as syncopation) supposedly characteristic of the race of their subject, which is usually African Americans. Many early rags are characteristic marches.
- Two-step – a pre-ragtime dance form popular until about 1911. A large number of rags are two-steps.
- Slow drag – another dance form associated with early ragtime. A modest number of rags are slow drags.
- Coon song – a pre-ragtime vocal form popular until about 1901. A song with crude, racist lyrics often sung by white performers in blackface. Gradually died out in favor of the ragtime song. It was strongly associated with ragtime in its day.
- Ragtime song – the vocal form of ragtime, more generic in theme than the coon song. Though this was the form of music most commonly considered "ragtime" in its day, many people today prefer to put it in the "popular music" category. Irving Berlin was the most commercially successful composer of ragtime songs, and his "Alexander's Ragtime Band" (1911) was the single most widely performed and recorded piece of this sort, even though it contains virtually no ragtime syncopation. Gene Greene was a famous singer in this style.
- Folk ragtime – ragtime that originated from small towns or assembled from folk strains, or at least sounded as if they did. Folk rags often have unusual chromatic features typical of composers with non-standard training.
- Classic rag – the Missouri-style ragtime popularized by Scott Joplin, James Scott, and others.
- Foxtrot – a dance fad that began in 1913. Fox-trots contain a dotted-note rhythm different from that of ragtime, but which nonetheless was incorporated into many late rags.
- Novelty piano – a piano composition emphasizing speed and complexity, which emerged after World War I. It is almost exclusively the domain of white composers.
- Stride piano – a style of piano that emerged after World War I, developed by and dominated by black East-coast pianists (James P. Johnson, Fats Waller, and Willie 'The Lion' Smith). Together with novelty piano, it may be considered a successor to ragtime, but is not considered by all to be "genuine" ragtime. Johnson composed the song that is arguably most associated with the Roaring Twenties, "Charleston". A recording of Johnson playing the song appears on the compact disc James P. Johnson: Harlem Stride Piano (Jazz Archives No. 111, EPM, Paris, 1997). Johnson's recorded version has a ragtime flavor.

== Influence on European composers ==
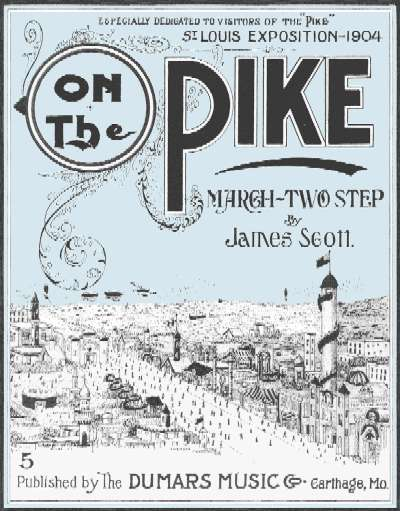
James Scott's 1904 "On the Pike", which refers to the midway of the St. Louis World's Fair of 1904

During the early 20th century, some European classical composers were influenced by this form. The first contact with ragtime was probably at the Paris Exposition in 1900, one of the stages of the European tour of John Philip Sousa. The first notable classical composer to take a serious interest in ragtime was Antonín Dvořák. French composer Claude Debussy emulated ragtime in three pieces for piano. The best-known remains the Golliwog's Cake Walk (from the 1908 Piano Suite Children's Corner). He later returned to the style with two preludes for piano: Minstrels, (1910) and General Lavine-excentric (from his 1913 Préludes), which was inspired by a Médrano circus clown.

Erik Satie, Arthur Honegger, Darius Milhaud, and the other members of Les Six in Paris never made any secret of their sympathy for ragtime, which is sometimes evident in their works. Consider, in particular, the ballet of Satie, Parade (Ragtime du Paquebot), (1917) and La Mort de Monsieur Mouche, an overture for piano for a drama in three acts, composed in the early 1900s in memory of his friend J. P. Contamine de Latour. In 1902 the American cakewalk was very popular in Paris and Satie two years later wrote two rags, La Diva de l'empire and Piccadilly. Despite the two Anglo-Saxon settings, the tracks appear American-inspired. La Diva de l'empire, a march for piano soloist, was written for Paulette Darty and initially bore the title Stand-Walk Marche; it was later subtitled Intermezzo Americain when Rouarts-Lerolle reprinted it in 1919. Piccadilly, another march, was initially titled The Transatlantique; it presented a stereotypical wealthy American heir sailing on an ocean liner on the New York–Europe route, going to trade his fortune for an aristocratic title in Europe. There is a similar influence in Milhaud's ballets Le boeuf sur le toite and Creation du Monde, which he wrote after a visit to Harlem during his trip in 1922. Even the Swiss composer Honegger wrote works in which the influence of African American music is pretty obvious. Examples include Pacific 231, Prélude et Blues and especially the Concertino for piano and orchestra.

Igor Stravinsky wrote a solo piano work called Piano-Rag-Music in 1919 and also included a rag in his theater piece L'Histoire du soldat (1918).

== Revivals ==
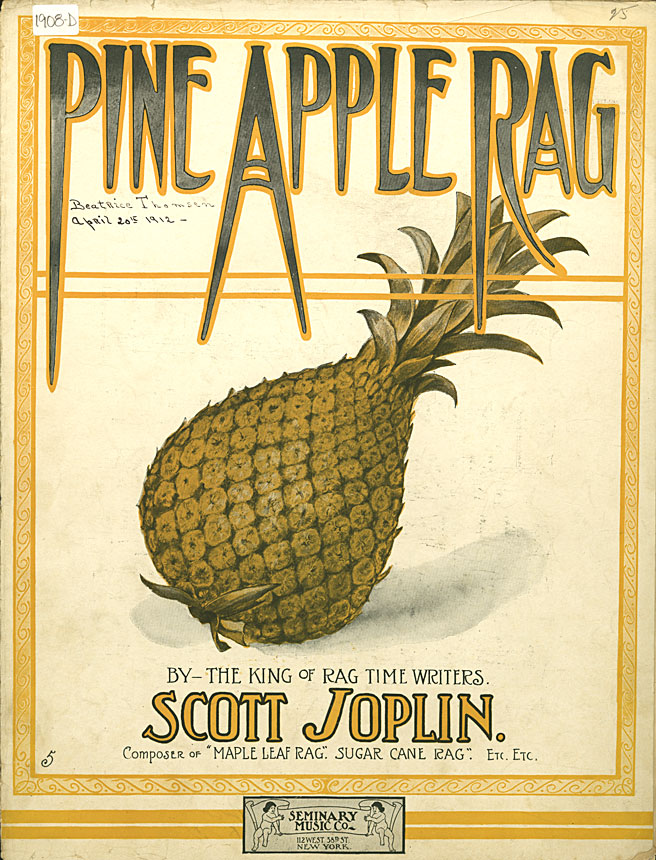
The first edition cover of "Pine Apple Rag", composed and released by Scott Joplin in 1908.

In the early 1940s, many jazz bands began to include ragtime in their repertoire, and as early as 1936 78 rpm records of Joplin's compositions were produced. Old numbers written for piano were rescored for jazz instruments by jazz musicians, which gave the old style a new sound. The most famous recording of this period is Pee Wee Hunt's version of Euday L. Bowman's "Twelfth Street Rag".

A more significant revival occurred in the 1950s. A wider variety of ragtime styles of the past were made available on records, and new rags were composed, published, and recorded. Much of the ragtime recorded in this period is presented in a light-hearted novelty style, looked to with nostalgia as the product of a supposedly more innocent time. A number of popular recordings featured "prepared pianos", playing rags on pianos with tacks on the hammers and the instrument deliberately somewhat out of tune, supposedly to simulate the sound of a piano in an old honky tonk.

Four events brought forward a different kind of ragtime revival in the 1970s. First, pianist Joshua Rifkin released a compilation of Scott Joplin's work, Scott Joplin: Piano Rags, on Nonesuch Records, which was nominated in 1971 for a Grammy Award for Best Classical Performance – Instrumental Soloist or Soloists (without orchestra) category. This recording reintroduced Joplin's music to the public in the manner the composer had intended, not as a nostalgic stereotype but as serious, respectable music. Second, the New York Public Library released a two-volume set of The Collected Works of Scott Joplin which renewed interest in Joplin among musicians and prompted new stagings of Joplin's opera Treemonisha. Next came the release and Grammy Award for The New England Ragtime Ensemble's recording of The Red Back Book, Joplin tunes edited by Gunther Schuller. Finally, with the release of the film The Sting in 1973, which had a Marvin Hamlisch soundtrack of Joplin rags, ragtime was brought to a wide audience. Hamlisch's rendering of Joplin's 1902 rag "The Entertainer" won an Academy Award, and was an American Top 40 hit in 1974, reaching No. 3 on May 18. Ragtime news and reviews publications during this period included The Ragtime Review (1962–1966), The Rag Times (bimonthly/sporadic, fl. 1962–2003), and The Mississippi Rag (monthly, 1973–2009).

In 1980, an adaption of E. L. Doctorow's historical novel Ragtime was released on screen. Randy Newman composed its music score, which was all original. In 1998, a stage version of Ragtime was produced on Broadway. With music by Stephen Flaherty and lyrics by Lynn Ahrens, the show featured several rags as well as songs in other musical styles.

== See also ==
- Animal dance
- Ragtime (film)
