= Grammy Award for Best Chamber Music Performance =

Music award category

- Awarded for: quality chamber music performances
- Country: United States
- Presented by: National Academy of Recording Arts and Sciences
- First award: 1959
- Final award: 2011
- Website: grammy.com

The Grammy Award for Best Chamber Music Performance was awarded from 1959 to 2011. The award was discontinued in 2012 in a major overhaul of Grammy categories; since 2012, recordings in this category have fallen under the Best Small Ensemble Performance category. The award has had several minor name changes:

- From 1959 to 1960 the award was known as Best Classical Performance - Chamber Music (including chamber orchestra)
- In 1961 it was awarded as Best Classical Performance - Vocal or Instrumental - Chamber Music
- From 1962 to 1964 it was awarded as Best Classical Performance - Chamber Music
- In 1965 it was awarded as two awards for Best Chamber Music Performance - Vocal and Best Chamber Music Performance - Instrumental
- From 1966 to 1967 it was awarded as Best Classical Chamber Music Performance - Instrumental or Vocal
- From 1968 to 1990 it was awarded as Best Chamber Music Performance
- In 1991 it was awarded as Best Chamber Music or Other Small Ensemble Performance
- From 1992 to 2011 it has been awarded as Best Chamber Music Performance

Years reflect the year in which the Grammy Awards were presented, for works released in the previous year.

== Recipients ==
Year	Winner(s)	Title	Nominees	Ref.
1959	Hollywood String Quartet	Beethoven: Quartet 130	Pablo Casals & Eugene Istomin for Beethoven: Trio in E Flat Major/Trio in D Major; Jascha Heifetz, William Primrose & Gregor Piatigorsky for Beethoven: Trio in E Flat, Op. 3; Budapest String Quartet for Ravel: Quartet in F Major/Debussy: Quartet in G Minor; Jascha Heifetz, William Primrose & Gregor Piatigorsky for Beethoven: Trio in G, Op. 9, No. 1/Trio in C Minor, Op. 9, No. 3	
1960	Arthur Rubinstein	Beethoven: Sonata No. 21 in C (Waldstein); Sonata No. 18 in E Flat	Nathan Milstein for 4 Italian Sonatas; Festival Quartet for Beethoven: Piano Quartet in E Flat, Op. 16; Schumann: Piano Quartet in E Flat, Op. 47; Felix Slatkin for Cello Galaxy; Felix Slatkin for Villa-Lobos: String Quartet	
1961	Laurindo Almeida	Conversations with the Guitar	Robert Shaw Chorale for Bach: Cantana No. 4; Christ Lag in Todesbanded; Juilliard Quartet for Debussy and Ravel Quartets; Griller Quartet for Haydn: Quartets, Opp. 71 and 74; Smetana Quartet for Janáček: String Quartets No. 1 and No. 2	
1962	Jascha Heifetz, Gregor Piatigorsky, William Primrose	Beethoven: Serenade, Op. 8; Kodály: Duo for Violin and Cello, Op. 7	Juilliard String Quartet for Berg: Lyric Suite; Sebern: 5 Pieces for String Quartet, Op. 5; 6 Bagatelles, Op. 6; Leonard Pennario, Eudice Shapiro, Sanford Schonbach, Victor Gottlieb for Fauré: First Quartet, Op. 15; Schumann: Clavier Quartet, Op. 47; Gary Graffman, Berl Senofsky for Fauré: Sonata No. 1; Debussy: Sonata No. 3; Erica Morini, Rudolf Firkusny for Franck and Mozart Sonatas	
1963	Jascha Heifetz, Gregor Piatigorsky, William Primrose	The Heifetz-Piatgorsky Concerts with Primrose, Pennario and Guests	Yehudi Menuhin, George Malcolm for Bach: Sonatas for Violin and Harpsichord; Hungarian Quartet for Bartók: Complete Quartets; Budapest String Quartet for Beethoven: The Late Quartets; Laurindo Almeida, Virginia Majewski, Vincent DeRosa for The Intimate Bach	
1964	Julian Bream Consort	An Evening of Elizabethan Music	Juilliard String Quartet for Beethoven: Quartet in F Minor, Op. 95; String Quartet in F Major, Op. 135; Zino Francescatti, Robert Casadesus for Beethoven: Sonatas for Violin and Piano (Nos. 3, 4 and 5); London Wind Soloists for Mozart: Wind Music, Vols. 1-5; Members of Budapest String Quartet, with Mieczysław Horszowski and Julius Levine for Schubert: Quintet in A Major for Piano and Strings, Op. 114	
1965	Jascha Heifetz, Gregor Piatigorsky, Jacob Lateiner	Beethoven: Trio No. 1 in E Flat, Op. 1, No. 1	Juilliard String Quartet for Beethoven: Quartet in A Minor, Op. 132; Sviatoslav Richter, Mstislav Rostropovich for Beethoven: Sonatas for Piano and Cella (Complete); Rudolf Serkin with the Budapest String Quartet for Brahms: Quintet in F Minor for Piano and Strings; Jean-Pierre Rampal, Robert Veyron-Lacroix for Mozart: The Complete Flute Sonatas; Igor Markevich conducting the Chamber Group for Stravinsky: L'Histoire du soldat (with Narrators Jean Cocteau, Peter Ustinov, Jean-Marie Fertey, Anne Tonietti	
1965	Noah Greenberg conducting New York Pro Musica	It Was a Lover and His Lass (Morley, Byrd and Others)	Let Petit Ensemble Vocal de Montreal for Dufey Motets; Golden Age Singers for Music for Voices and Violins in the Time of Shakespeare; Deller Consort for Music of Medieval France, 1200-1400, Sacred and Secular; Vocal Arts Ensemble for Music of the Renaissance (Pes Prez, Morley); Hermione Gingold, Russell Oberlin, Thomas Dunn for Walton: Façade	
1966	Juilliard String Quartet	Bartók: The 6 String Quartets	Yehudi Menuhin and members of the Bath Festival Orchestra for A Purcell Anthology; Erick Friedman, Bruce Prince-Joseph for Bach: The 6 Sonatas for Violin and Harpsichord; Vladimir Ashkenazy, Malcolm Frager for Mozart/Schumann Recital; Isaac Stern, Eugene Istomin, Leonard Rose for Schubert: Trio No. 1 in B Flat for Piano; Joseph Szigeti, Bartók for Sonata Recital by Szigeti and Bartók (Bartók, Beethoven, Debussy)	
1967	Boston Symphony Chamber Players	Boston Symphony Chamber Players - Works of Mozart, Brahms, Beethoven, Fine, Copland, Carter, Piston	Jascha Heifetz, Gregor Piatigorsky, Leonard Pennario for Arensky: Trio in D Minor for Violin, Cello and Piano; Martinů: Duo for Violin and Cello; Eugene Istomin, Isaac Stern, Leonard Rose for Beethoven: Trio No. 6 in B Flat, Op. 97 (Archduke); Erick Friedman, André Previn for Fracnk: Sonata in A Major for Violin and Piano; Debussy: Sonata in G Minor for Violin and Piano; Weller Quartet for Haydn: Quartets, Op. 33	
1968	Ravi Shankar, Yehudi Menuhin	West Meets East	Yale Quartet for Beethoven: Quartet No. 15 in A Minor, Op. 132; Arthur Rubinstein, Guarneri Quartet for Brahms: Quintet in F Minor for Piano, Op. 34; Juilliard Quartet for Ives: Quartets Nos. 1 and 3; Philadelphia Brass Ensemble for The Glorious Sound of Brass	
1969	Vittorio Negri (conductor), E Power Biggs with the Edward Tarr Brass Ensemble & Gabrieli Consort	Glory of Gabrieli Vol. II - Canzonas for Brass, Winds, Strings and Organs	Guarneri Quartet for Beethoven: The 5 Middle Quartets; Eugene Istomin, Isaac Stern, Leonard Rose for Beethoven: Trio No. 3 in C Minor; Mendelssohn: Trio No. 1 in D Minor; Walter Trampler, Ronald Turini for Hindemith: Sonata for Viola and Piano; Julian Bream and the Cremona String Quartet for Julian Bream and His Friends	
1970	Chicago Brass Ensemble, Cleveland Brass Ensemble, and Philadelphia Brass Ensemble	Gabrieli: Antiphonal Music of Gabrieli (Canzoni for Brass Choirs)	Julian Bream, George Malcolm for Bach and Vivaldi Sonatas for Lute and Harpsichord; Grumiaux Trio for Beethoven: Trios for Strings; Arthur Rubinstein and Guarneri Quartet for Brahms: Quartets for Piano and Strings (3); Schumann: Quintet in E Flat Major for Piano and Strings; Jacqueline du Pre, Daniel Barenboim for Brahms: Sonata in F Minor and F Major for Cello and Piano; Itzhak Perlman, Vladimir Ashkenazy for Prokofiev: Sonatas for Violin and Piano; Borodin Quartet for Shostakovich: String Quartets (Complete)	
1971	Eugene Istomin, Isaac Stern, Leonard Rose	Beethoven: The Complete Piano Trios	Guarneri Quartet for Beethoven: The 5 Late Quartets; Sviatoslav Richter, David Oistrakh for Franck: Sonata in A Major for Violin and Piano; Brahms: Sonata No. 3 in D Minor; Gunther Schuller for Ives: Calcium Light Night; Benjamin Britten (conductor), English Chamber Orchestra and Ambrosian Singers for Salute to Percy Grainger	
1972	Juilliard String Quartet	Debussy: Quartet in G Minor; Ravel: Quartet in F Major	Arthur Weisberg (conductor), Contemporary Chamber Ensemble, Jan DeGaetani and Michael M. Dash for Crumb: Ancient Voices of Children; Beaux Arts Trio for Dvořák: Piano Trios (Complete); Nikolaus Harnoncourt (conductor), Concentus Musicus for Fux-Schmelzer: Music in the Hapsburg Palace; Paul Zukofsky, Gilbert Kalish, Charles Russo and Robert Sylvester for Ives: Chamber Music	
1973	Julian Bream, John Williams	Julian and John (selections by Lawes, Carulli, Albéniz, Granados)	Isaac Stern and Alexander Zakin for Bartók: Sonatas Nos. 1 and 2 for Violin and Piano; Arthur Rubinstein and Guarneri Quartet for Dvořák: Quintet in A Major for Piano; John Williams (guitarist) and Rafael Puyana for Music for Guitar and Harpsichord; Igor Kipnis and Thurston Dart for Music for Two Harpsichords; Guarneri Quartet for Schubert: Quartet No. 13 in A Minor; David Oistrakh and Sviatoslav Richter for Shostakovich: Sonata for Violin and Piano; La Salle Quartet for String Quartets of the New Viennese School	
1974	Gunther Schuller (conductor), New England Conservatory Ragtime Ensemble	Joplin: The Red Back Book	Julian Bream, Melos Ensemble of London and David Atherton for Bennett: Concerto for Guitar and Chamber Ensemble; Cleveland Quartet for Brahms: Quartets for Strings; Arthur Rubinstein and Guarneri Quartet for Dvořák: Piano Quartet in E Flat Major, Op. 87	
1975	Pierre Fournier, Arthur Rubinstein & Henryk Szeryng	Brahms: Trios (Complete)/Schumann: Trio No. 1 in D Minor	Juilliard String Quartet for Beethoven: The Late Quartets; Aaron Copland (conductor), Stanley Tonkel, Ray Moore, Milt Cherin for Copland: Appalachian Spring; Tokyo String Quartet for Haydn: String Quartets, Op. 50 No. 1 & 2; Paul Zukofsky, George Kalish for Ives: String Sonatas Nos. 1-4; Ralph Grierson, George Spoonholtz & the Southland Stingers for Joplin: Palm Leaf Rag; Julian Bream and John Williams for Julian and John, Vol. 2 (Albéniz, Granados, etc.)	
1976	Arthur Rubinstein, Henryk Szeryng, Pierre Fournier	Schubert: Trios No. 1 in B Flat Major, Op. 99 and No. 2 in E Flat Major, Op. 100 (Piano Trios)	Heinz Hollinger, Christiane Joccottet and Marcal Cervera for Baroque Oboe Recital: Works by Bach, Couperin and Marais; Jean-Pierre Rampal, Claude Bolling for Bolling: Suite for Flute and Piano; Ralph Grierson and Artie Kane for Gershwin: Gershwin's Wonderful (Side 1: American in Paris 3 Preludes); Concord Quartet for Ives: Quartets Nos. 1 and 2; Itzhak Perlman and André Previn for Joplin: The Easy Winners and Other Ragtime Music of Scott Joplin	
1977	David Munrow (conductor), Early Music Consort of London	The Art of Courtly Love	The Cleveland Quartet for Barber: Quartet for Strings, Op. 11; Ives: Quartet No. 2 for Strings (Two American Masterpieces); Jean-Pierre Rampal, Claude Bolling for Bolling: Suite for Flute and Piano; Jacqueline du Pré, Daniel Barenboim for Beethoven: Sonatas for Cello (Complete); Prague String Quartet for Dvořák: Quartets, Opp. 96 and 105; Glenn Gould and Philadelphia Brass Ensemble for Hindemith: Sonatas for Brass and Piano; Tashi (Peter Serkin, Fred Sherry, Ida Kavafian, Richard Stoltzman) for Messiaen: Quartet for the End of Time; Thomas Iglois, Alberni Quartet for Schubert: Quintet in C, Op. 163; Fitzwilliam Quartet for Shostakovich: Quartet No. 14 in F Sharp Major; Jascha Heifetz, Gregor Piatigorsky for The Heifetz-Piatigorsky Concerts	
1978	Juilliard String Quartet	Schoenberg: Quartets for Strings (Complete)	David Munrow (conductor), Early Music Consort of London for A Contemporary Elizabethan Concert (Dowland, Williams, Purcell, etc.); Guarneri Quartet for Bartók: Quartets for Strings (6); Prague String Quartet for Dvořák: Quartets No. 8 in E Major, Op. 80, and No. 10 in E Flat Major, Op. 51; Emanuel Ax, Cleveland Quartet for Dvořák: Quintet for Piano in A Major, Op. 81; Ravi Shankar, Yehudi Menuhin, Jean-Pierre Rampal, Martine Geliot, Alla Rakha for Improvisations: East Meets West, Album 3; Pezzo Elegiaco, Vladimir Horowitz, Isaac Stern, Mstislav Rostropovich for Rachmaninov: Sonata for Cello and Piano in G Minor, Op. 19, Andante; tTchaikovsky: Trio for Piano	
1979	Itzhak Perlman, Vladimir Ashkenazy	Beethoven: Sonatas for Violin and Piano (Complete)	Tokyo String Quartet for Bartók: Quartet No. 2 for Strings, Op. 17; Quartet No. 6; Itzhak Perlman, Pinchas Zukerman for Duets for 2 Violins; John Williams, Carlos Bonell, Brian Gascione, Morris Pert, Keith Marjoram for John Williams and Friends; Arthur Rubinstein and members of the Guarneri Quartet for Mozart: Quartets for Piano and Strings; Melos Quartet and Mstislav Rostropovich for Schubert: Quintet in C Major for Strings; David Munrow (conductor), David Munrow Recorder Consort, members of the Early Music Consort of London for The Art of the Recorder	
1980	Dennis Russell Davies (conductor) and St. Paul Chamber Orchestra	Copland: Appalachian Spring	Tokyo String Quartet for Debussy: Quartet in G Minor; Ravel: Quartet in F; Itzhak Perlman, Lynn Harrell and Pinchas Zukerman for Dohnányi: Serenade, Op. 10; Beethoven: Serenade, Op. 8; Fitzwilliam Quartet for Shostakovich: Quartets Nos. 5 and 6; Jacqueline du Pre, Daniel Barenboim for Brahms: Sonata in F Minor and F Major for Cello and Piano; Itzhak Perlman, Vladimir Ashkenazy for Prokofiev: Sonatas for Violin and Piano; Michael Debost, James Galway for Telemann: 6 Sonatas for 2 Flutes; Yoshikazu Fukumura (conductor), the Koto Flute, Ransom Wilson and The New Koto Ensemble of Tokyo for Vivaldi: 4 Flute Concertos; Pierre Boulez, Daniel Barenboim, Pinchas Zukerman, Pay and Ensemble Inter-Contemporain for Berg: Chamber Concerto for Piano and Violin; 4 Pieces for Clarinet and Piano; Pinchas Zukerman, Claude Bolling, Max Hediguer and Marcel Sabiani for Bolling: Suite for Violin and Jazz Piano	
1981	Itzhak Perlman and Pinchas Zukerman	Music for 2 Violins (Moszkowski: Suite for 2 Violins; Shostakovich: Duets; Prokofiev: Sonata for 2 Violins)	Cleveland Quartet for Beethoven: Early Quartets, Op. 18; Pinchas Zukerman and Marc Neikrug for Debussy: Sonata No. 3 in G Minor for Violin and Piano; Fauré: Sonata in A Major for Violin and Piano; Barenboim, Luben Yordanoff, Albert Tetard, Claude Desurmont for Messiaen: Quartet for the End of Time; Juilliard Quartet for Schubert: Quartet No. 15 in G Major, Op. 161	
1982	Itzhak Perlman, Lynn Harrell and Vladimir Ashkenazy	Tchaikovsky: Piano Trio in A Minor	Itzhak Perlman, Pinchas Zukerman for Bartók: Duos for 2 Violins; Tokyo String Quartet for Bartók: Quartets for Strings (Complete); Ray Still, Itzhak Perlman, Pinchas Zukerman, Lynn Harrell for Oboe Quartets (Mozart, J.C. Bach, Karl Stamitz, Wanhal); Guarneri Quartet for The Complete String Quartets of Brahms and Schumann	
1983	Richard Stoltzman, Richard Goode	Brahms: The Sonatas for Clarinet and Piano, Op. 120	Guarneri Quartet for Borodin: Quartet No. 2 in D Major; Dohnányi: Quartet No. 2 in D Flat Major, Op. 15; Lynn Harrell, Vladimir Ashkenazy for Brahms: Sonatas for Cello and Piano No. 1 in E Minot, Op. 38, and NO. 2 in F Major, Op. 99; Cleveland Quartet, Pinchas Zukerman, Bernard Greenhouse for Brahms: The String Sextets (B Flat Major, Op. 18, and G Major, Op. 36); James Galway, Kyung-Wha Chung, Phillip Moll, Moray Welsh for Bach: Trio Sonatas (BWV 1038, 1039, 1079)	
1984	Mstislav Rostropovich, Rudolf Serkin	Brahms: Sonata for Cello and Piano in E Minor, Op. 38, and Sonata in F Major, Op. 99	Juilliard String Quartet for Bartók: The String Quartets (6); Itzhak Perlman, Lynn Harrell, Vladimir Ashkenazy for Beethoven: Trio No. 6 in B Flat, Op. 97 (Archduke); Michael Riesman (conductor), The Philip Glass Ensemble for Glass: The Photographer; Nancy Allen, Tokyo String Quartet, Ransom Wilson, David Shifrin for Ravel: Introduction and Allegro; La Salle Quartet for Zemlinsky: The String Quartets	
1985	Juilliard String Quartet	Beethoven: The Late String Quartets	The Cleveland Quartet, Emmanuel Ax for Brahms: Piano Quintet in F Minor, Op. 34; Guarneri Quartet, Pinchas Zukerman for Brahms: The String Quintet in F & G; Michael Riesman (conductor), The Philip Glass Ensemble for Glass: The Photographer; Chick Corea, Gary Burton, Ikwhan Bae, Carol Shive, Karen Dreyfus, Fred Sherry for Corea: Lyric Suite for Sextet; Itzhak Perlman, Daniel Barenboim for Beethoven: Violin Sonatas K. 301-4	
1986	Emmanuel Ax, Yo-Yo Ma	Brahms: Cello and Piano Sonatas in E Major and F Major	Itzhak Perlman, Jorge Bolet, Juilliard String Quartet for Chausson: Concerto for Violin, Piano and String Quartet, Op. 21; Itzhak Perlman, Samuel Sanders for Dvořák: Sonatina in G and 4 Romantic Pieces; Smetana: From My Homeland; André Previn, Vienna Wind Soloists for Mozart: Piano and Wind Quintet in E Flat; Beethoven: Piano and Wind Quintet in E Flat; Daniel Barenboim, Pinchas Zukerman, Jacqueline du Pre for Tchaikovsky: Piano Trio in A Minor	
1987	Emmanuel Ax, Yo-Yo Ma	Beethoven: Cello and Piano Sonata No. 4 in C and Variations	Benny Goodman, Berkshire String Quartet, Fritz Maag, Leon Pammers for Benny Goodman: Private Collection; Itzhak Perlman, Vladimir Ashkenazy for Brahms: Violin and Piano Sonatas No. 1 in G, No. 2 in A and No. 3 in D Minor; Hungarian Dances; Members of the Chicago Symphony Winds, Vocalists for Mozart: Music for Basset Horns (Divertimenti, Notturni, Adagios); Lynn Harrell, Vladimir Ashkenazy for Rachmaninov: Cello and Piano Sonata	
1988	Itzhak Perlman, Lynn Harrell, Vladimir Ashkenazy	Beethoven: The Complete Piano Trios	Murray Perahia, members of the Amadeus Quartet for Brahms: Piano Quartet No. 1 in G Minor; Beaux Arts Trio for Dvořák: Piano Trio in E Minor (Dumky); Mendelssohn: Piano Trio in D Minor; Jean-Pierre Rampal, Isaac Stern, Salvatore Accardo, Mstislav Rostropovich for Mozart: The Flute Quartets (K. 285, 285A, 285B, 298); Kronos Quartet for White Man Sleeps (Music by Volans, Ives, Hassell, Coleman, Johnson, Bartók)	
1989	Murray Perahia, Georg Solti, David Corkhill, Evelyn Glennie	Bartók: Sonata for 2 Pianos and Percussion; Brahms: Variation on a Theme by Joseph Haydn for 2 Piano	Gidon Kremer, Martha Argerich for Beethoven: Violin-Piano SOnatas No. 4 in A, Op. 23, and No. 5 in F, Op. 24; Guarneri Quartet for Dvořák: String Quartet in F (American Quartet); Smetana: String Quartet in E Minor (From My Life); Kim Kashkashian, Robert Levin for Hindemith: Viola Sonata Op. 11, No. 4; Violin Sonata, Op. 25, No. 4; Violin Sonatas, '37; James Levine, Ensemble Wien-Berlin for Mozart: Quintet in E Flat for Piano and Wings, K. 452; Beethoven: Qunitet in E Flat for Piano and Winds	
1990	Emerson String Quartet	Bartók: 6 String Quartets	Guarneri Quartet for Beethoven: String Quartets No. 13 in B Flat; Grosse Fuge in B Flat; Anne-Sophie Mutter, Mstislav Rostropovich, Bruno Guiranna for Beethoven: String Trios (E Flat, Op. 3 Serenade in D, Op. 8; G, Op. 9, No. 2; C, Op. 9, No. 3); Shlomo Mintz, Yefim Bronfman for Prokofiev: Violin Sonatas Nos. 1 in F Minor and 2 in D; Emmanuel Ax, Isaac Stern, Yo-Yo Ma for Shostakovich: Trio No. 2 for Violin, Cello and Piano in E Minor, Op. 67 and Sonata for Cello and Piano in D Minor	
1991	Daniel Barenboim, Itzhak Perlman	Brahms: The Three Violin Sonatas	Mona Golabek, Andres Cardenes, Jeffrey Solow for Arensky: Piano Trio No. 2 in D Minor; Tchaikovsky: Piano Trio in A Minor; Richard Stoltzman, Richard Goode, Lucy Chapman Stoltzman for Bartók: Contrasts; Stravinsky: L'Histoire du Soldat-Suite; Ives: Largo, Songs; Kronos Quartet for Crumb: Black Angels; Tallis: Spem in Alium; Marta: Doom. A Sigh; Ives: They Are There!; Shostakovich: Quartet No. 8; Juilliard String Quartet, Benita Valente, Jan DeGaetani, Jon Humphrey, Thomas Paul for Haydn: The Seven Last Words of Christ	
1992	Emanuel Ax, Isaac Stern, Jaime Laredo, Yo-Yo Ma	Johannes Brahms: Piano Quartets	Arditti String Quartet for Arditti II; Gidon Kremer, Martha Argerich for Bartók: Violin Sonata No. 1; Janáček: Violin Sonata; Olivier Messiaen: Theme & Variations for Violin & Piano; Juilliard String Quartet, Christopher Oldfather for Carter: The Four String Quartets; Duo for Violin and Piano; Hilliard Ensemble for Gesualdo: Tenebrae	
1993	Emanuel Ax, Yo-Yo Ma	Brahms: Sonatas for Cello and Piano	Tokyo String Quartet for Beethoven: The Late String Quartets; Isaac Stern, Cho-Liang Lin, Yo-Yo Ma, Sharon Robinson, Jaime Laredo, Michael Tree for Brahms: Sextets, Op. 18 and 36; Theme and Variations; Rudolf Firkusny, the Ridge String Quartet for Dvořák: Piano Quintets Op. 81 and Op. 5; Carmina Quartet for Szymanowski: String Quartets Nos. 1, Op. 37, and 2, Op. 56; Webern: 'Langsamer Satz' for String Quartet	
1994	Emerson String Quartet	Ives: String Quartets	Itzhak Perlman, Pinchas Zukerman, Lynn Harrell for Beethoven: Complete String Trios; Emanuel Ax, Isaac Stern, Jaime Laredo, Yo-Yo Ma for Fauré: Piano Quartets; Janos Starker, Rudolf Firkusny for Martinů: Cello Sonatas; Gidon Kremer, Martha Argerich for Prokofiev: Violin Sonatas	
1995	Daniel Barenboim, Dale Clevenger, Larry Combs, Daniele Damiano, Hansjorg Schellenberger, Berlin Philharmonic	Beethoven/Mozart: Quintets (Chicago-Berlin)	György Pauk, Kalman Berkes, Jenő Jandó for Bartók: Violin Sonatas Nos. 1 & 2; Contrasts; Martha Argerich, Mischa Maisky for Beethoven: Cello Sonatas Op. 69 and 102; Juilliard String Quartet for Debussy/Ravel/Dutilleux: Quartets; Emerson String Quartet, Menahem Pressler for Dvořák: Piano Quintet, Op. 81; Piano Quartet, Op. 87	
1996	Emanuel Ax, Yo-Yo Ma, Richard Stoltzman	Brahms/Beethoven/Mozart: Clarinet Trios	Vermeer String Quartet for Haydn: The Seven Last Words of Christ; Alban Berg Quartet for Janáček: String Quartets Nos. 1 & 2; St. Peterburg String Quartet for Shostakovich: String Quartets No. 3, 5, & 7; Emerson String Quartet for Webern: Works for String Quartet	
1997	Cleveland Quartet	Corigliano: String Quartet	Martha Argerich, Gidon Kremer for Beethoven: Violin Sonatas. No. 9 (Kreutzer) & 10; Anner Bylsma, Lambert Orkis for Brahms: Cello Sonatas Nos. 1 & 2; Schumann: 5 Stucke Im Volkston, Op. 102; Olaf Bar, Barbara Bonney, Kurt Streit, Anne Sofie von Otto for Brahms: Liebeslieder-Walzer, Op. 52; Neue Liebesleider-Walzer, Op. 65; Martha Argerich for Schumann: Piano Quintet; Piano Quartet	
1998	Emerson Quartet	Beethoven: The String Quartets	Beaux Arts Trio for Beaux Arts Trio Plays Turina, Granados; Anne-Sophie Mutter, Lambert Orkis for The Berlin Recital (Words of Brahms, Debussy, Franck, Mozart); Kronos Quartet for Early Music - Lachryma Antiqua (Works of Machaut, Tye, Lamb, Dowland, etc.); Jaime Laredo, Cho-Liang Lin, Yo-Yo Ma, Sharon Robinson, Isaac Stern for Schumann/Boccherini: Quintets	
1999	André Previn, Gil Shaham	American Scenes (Works of Copland, Previn, Barber, Gershwin)	Takács Quartet for Bartók: The 6 String Quartets; Kim Kashkashian, Robert Levin for Brahms: Sonatas for Viola & Piano Nos. 1 & 2; Pierre-Laurent Aimard, Saschko Gawriloff, London Winds, Marie-Luise Neunecker, Tabea Zimmerman for Ligeti: Chamber Music (Trio for Violin, Horn and Piano; Ten Pieces for Wind Quintet, Etc.); Kronos Quartet for Schnittke: The Complete String Quartets (Nos. 1, 2, 3, etc.)	
2000	Anne-Sophie Mutter, Lambert Orkis	Beethoven: The Violin Sonatas (Nos. 1-3, Op. 12; Nos. 1-3, Op. 30; "Spring" Sonata, etc.)	Eroica Trio for Dvořák: Piano Trio "Dumky", Op. 90; Shostakovich: Piano Trio No. 2; Rachmaninoff: Vocalise; Boston Symphony Orchestra Chamber Players, Gilbert Kalish for Hindemith: Quartet for Clarinet, Violin, Cello and Piano; Shostakovich: Piano Quintet in G Minor, Op. 57; Joseph Carver, Andreas Haefliger, Takács Quartet for Shubert: The "Trout Quintet; Wolf: Italian Serenade; Mozart: Eine kleine Nachtmusik; Martha Argerich, Gidon Kremer, Mischa Maisky for Tchaikovsky/Shostakovich: Piano Trios	
2001	Emerson String Quartet	Shostakovich: The String Quartets	Itzhak Perlman, Martha Argerich for Beethoven/Franck: Violin Sonatas; Members of the Chamber Music Society of Lincoln Center for Debussy: The Complete Chamber Music; Lynn Harrell, Nigel Kennedy for Duos for Violin & Cello (Works of Ravel, Handel, Halvorsen, etc.); Quatuor Mosaïques for Haydn: String Quartets, Op. 76 (Nos. 1-6)	
2002	The Angeles String Quartet	Haydn: The Complete String Quartets	Pierre Boulez, Ensemble InterContemporain for Boulez: Sur Incises; Messagequisse; Anthemes 2; Myung-Whun Chung, Paul Meyer, Gil Shaham, Jian Wang for Messiaen: Quartet for the End of Time; Cuarteto Latinoamericano for Villa-Lobos: String Quartets, Vol. 6, Nos. 4, 9, 11; The Emperor Quartet for Walton: The String Quartets	
2003	Takács Quartet	Beethoven: String Quartets ("Razumovsky", Op. 59, 1-3; "Harp", Op. 74)	Mark Dresser, Tara Helen O'Connor, Todd Palmer, St Lawrence String Quartet & Ying Quartet for Golijov: Yiddishbbuk; Richard Egarr, Andrew Manze for Handel: Complete Violin Sonatas; Martha Argerich, Mischa Maisky for Live In Japan (Chopin, Franck, Debussy); Silke Avenhaus, Macha Deubner, Rosamunde Quartett, Valentin Silvestrov for Silvestrov: Leggiero, Pesante	
2004	Kronos Quartet, Dawn Upshaw	Berg: Lyric Suite	Michael Cox, Nicholas Daniel, Maggini Quartet for Bliss: String Quartet No. 1; Conversations for Flute, Oboe, Violin, Viola and Cello, etc.; Speculum Musicae for Carter: Oboe Quartet; Boris Berman, Vermeer Quartet for Shostakovich/Schnittke: Piano Quintets; Kronos Quartet for Vasks: String Quartet, No. 4	
2005	Martha Argerich, Mikhail Pletnev	Prokofiev (Arr. Pletnev): Cinderella - Suite for Two Pianos; Ravel: Ma Mère L'Oye	Leila Josefowicz, John Novacek for John Adams: Road Movies; Leif Ove Andsnes, Christian Tetzlaff for Bartók: Violin Sonatas Nos. 1 & 2, etc.; Maggini Quartet for Bridge: String Quartets Nos. 1 & 3; The Hilliard Ensemble for Machaut: Motets	
2006	Emerson String Quartet	Mendelssohn: The Complete String Quartets	The Borealis Wind Quintet for A La Carte - Short Works for Winds; Vermeer Quartet for Bartók: The Six String Quartets; Borodin Quartet for Borodin Quartet 60th Anniversary; Martha Argerich for Martha Argerich and Friends: Live from the Lugano Festival	
2007	Emerson String Quartet	Intimate Voices	The Chicago Chamber Musicians for Chamber works for Winds and String by Mozart; Andrew Russo, Corey Cerovsek, Steven Heyman for Corigliano: Violin Sonata, Étude Fantasy; Martha Argerich and Friends for Martha Argerich and Friends: Live from the Lugano Festival 2005; Beaux Arts Trio for Shostakovich: Piano Trios 1 & 2, Seven Romances on Verses by Alexander Blok	
2008	Eighth Blackbird	Strange Imaginary Animals	Artists of the Royal Conservatory Ensemble for On the Threshold of Hope; Oleg Maisenberg, Sabine Meyer for Saint-Saëns/Poulenc/Devienne/Milhaud; Ying Quartet for Tchaikovsky: Three String Quartets, Souvenir de Florence; Joseph Banowetz, Alton Chung Ming Chan for 30 Songs of the Russian People	
2009	Pacifica Quartet	Elliott Carter: String Quartets Nos. 1 and 5	Stephen Hough, Takács Quartet for Brahms: String Quartet Op. 51, No. 2; Piano Quintet, Op. 34; Trio Mediaeval for Folk Songs; ARC Ensemble for Right Through the Bone - Julius Röntgen Chamber Music; Jennifer Koh, Reiko Uchida for String Poetic	
2010	Emerson Quartet	Intimate Letters	Enso Quartet for Ginastera: String Quartets (Complete); Guarneri Quartet for The Hungarian Album; Martha Argerich, Gidon Kremer for Schumann/Bartók: The Berlin Recital; Yolanda Kondonassis, Cynthia Phelphs, Joshua Smith for Takemitsu: And Then I Knew 'Twas Wind	
2011	Parker Quartet	Ligeti: String Quartets Nos. 1 & 2	Isabelle Faust, Alexander Melnikov for Beethoven: Complete Sonatas for Violin & Piano; Marc Regnier, Tacy Edwards, Natalia Khoma, Marco Sartor for Gnattali: Solo & Chamber Works for Guitar; Eliesha Nelson, John McLaughlin Williams for Porter: Complete Viola Works; Fred Sherry String Quartet for Schoenberg: String Quartets Nos. 3 & 4	
