= Early Jazz: Its Roots and Musical Development =

Jazz history survey through 1932

- Series: The History of jazz; v. 1
- Publisher: Oxford University Press
- Publication date: 1968
- ISBN: 0195040430
- OCLC: 13331781
- Followed by: The Swing Era
- Website: https://global.oup.com/academic/product/early-jazz-9780195040432

Early Jazz: Its Roots and Musical Development, by Gunther Schuller, is a seminal study of jazz from its origins through the early 1930s, first published in 1968. It has since been translated into five languages (Italian, French, Japanese, Portuguese and Spanish). When it was published, it was the first volume of a projected two volume history of jazz through the Swing era. (Schuller died before he could write a promised third volume, on the bebop period and after.) The book takes an enthusiastic tone to its subject. A notable feature of the series is transcriptions of jazz performances, which increase its value for the musically literate.

== Chapters ==
=== Preface ===
Schuller briefly discusses some earlier histories of jazz and explains why recorded performance will be the object of study. He indicates where the separation lies between the present book and the projected second volume on the next period of jazz, the Swing Era.

=== 1. The Origins ===
This chapter briefly covers the sociological and musical backgrounds of jazz. It then goes into detail regarding what Schuller takes to be the major elements of jazz. In the section on rhythm, the book describes swing technically, while first admitting that "a definition of swing has about the same sketchy relationship to swing itself as jazz notation has to performed jazz." The section includes observations made in the ante-bellum and Civil War periods, as well as references to African rhythms and the jazz of the period that is the book's subject.

The section on form covers African elements, European influences, and forms developed by African-Americans in the South. Schuller concludes that the blues "left enough room to preserve a number of African rhythmic-melodic characteristics." In a brief discussion of the role of harmony in the origins of jazz, the book notes that African and European systems of harmony overlapped sufficiently to allow their synthesis without "profound problems." The section on melody again finds African characteristics in a fundamental characteristic of jazz melody: the use of blue notes. An additional African influence is the way that melody in predecessors of jazz followed speech characteristics.

A brief section on timbre again emphasizes the African roots of an emphasis on the individuality of a performer's tone color. Schuller notes that "African instrumentation reflects the vocal quality of African speech." He cites various jazz performers for the natural quality of their sound production, sound that makes each performer readily identifiable. A final brief section in this chapter, on improvisation, states that group improvisation, a hallmark of early jazz, is a distinctively African practice. Schuller counters a variety of other theories of the historical basis of jazz improvisation. He summarizes the "Origins" chapter by observing, "Many more aspects of jazz derive directly from African musical-social traditions than has been assumed."

=== 2. The beginnings ===
While focusing with considerable detail on New Orleans, Schuller is at pains to emphasize that jazz arose in the period immediately after 1900 in many places in the United States, even while other African-American music that may have incorporated some jazz characteristics was simultaneously taking shape without actually being jazz. He asserts that the varied kinds of music that soon fused as jazz had the blues in common. For both the varied locations and the commonality of blues, Schuller details as examples developments in Denver and Springfield, Ohio, as well as New Orleans.

Some of the already leading jazz musicians rapidly came to wider public notice when they made their first issued recordings, in 1923. This group included King Oliver, Freddie Keppard, Louis Armstrong, Jelly Roll Morton, Sidney Bechet and Bennie Moten. (The blues singer Bessie Smith also began recording that year.) Despite having these recordings in hand, Schuller is unwilling to extrapolate historically back to what earlier jazz would have sounded like, preferring to rely on written and verbal reports.

=== 3. The First Great Soloist ===
This chapter focuses on the musical innovations that Louis Armstrong created. Although it includes some biographical information about Armstrong, its emphasis is quite firmly on Armstrong's recording sessions and recorded performances of the 1920s, and his interactions with other musicians and musical organizations. Armstrong's associates on these record dates, such as Johnny Dodds and Earl Hines, also come in for some musical analysis.

=== 4. The First Great Composer ===
After some reflections on the role of composition in what is most often an improviser's art, Schuller examines the life and work of "the legendary Ferdinand Joseph ('Jelly Roll') Morton... the first of that precious jazz elite: composer." After a discussion of Morton's life and reputation, which finds his contemporaries confirming some of his various boasts, this chapter, like the previous one, delves into Morton's recording sessions and recorded performances of the 1920s, from a music-analytic view.

=== 5. Virtuoso Performers of the Twenties ===
Sandwiched between opening and closing titled sections on Bix Beiderbecke and Bessie Smith are treatments of clarinetists, brass players, and Harlem pianists. A prefatory opening section discusses the earliest white jazz bands, particularly the Original Dixieland Jazz Band (ODJB), and a little about the New Orleans Rhythm Kings. Some discussion of the unusual career of ODJB is followed by an analysis of their musical background and style.

The section on Beiderbecke discusses the various musical groupings in which he functioned during his brief recording career, and provides some musical analysis of his work in these groups. After naming a half dozen noteworthy New Orleans clarinetists, the clarinetists section gives a few pages of analysis to each of the three that Schuller terms the greatest in that city's early jazz tradition: Sidney Bechet, Johnny Dodds and Jimmy Noone.

The section on brass players, while mentioning some half dozen who became prominent in the big bands that began in this or the following period, is concerned primarily with three players who recorded outstanding work but did not follow this with successful careers. They are the trombonist Jimmy Harrison and the trumpeters Johnny Dunn and Jabbo Smith, especially the latter. As an indication of the latter's virtuosic creativity, a transcription of his improvised duet with the clarinetist Omer Simeon occupies 32 bars spread over two full pages.

The section on Harlem pianists is mostly devoted to the musical interests and stride piano style of James P. Johnson. A briefer portion follows, concerning Johnson's disciple Fats Waller. The final section in the chapter, on Bessie Smith, devotes considerable attention to her vocal methods. Schuller provides additional discussion regarding her recorded interaction with various outstanding collaborators such as Johnson and Armstrong, among others.

=== 6. The Big Bands ===
This chapter begins by pointing out the way that technological developments (radio and recordings), and the economic lift they provided to musicians, generated crosscurrents in jazz, resulting in a move towards jazz orchestras, the big bands, by the end of the 1920s. Schuller then considers two sites of big band activity: New York and Kansas City. The New York musical personalities that he considers at some length are James Reese Europe, who prefigured jazz developments but died in 1919 at the height of his influence; as well as Fletcher Henderson and Don Redman, the prime mover and arranger in the Henderson band.

Henderson's band was preeminent, but other leaders were forming their own big bands competing with Henderson. The chapter discusses these bands and musicians more briefly, including McKinney's Cotton Pickers, Charlie Johnson's Paradise Ten, and the Missourians.

In the discussion of Kansas City jazz in the 1920s, Schuller observes that the region was the birthplace of ragtime, an important popular music in the area. Concert bands like John Philip Sousa's were also very popular there. These currents provide a background for understanding the music of Bennie Moten, which gets some detailed analysis. Other regionally prominent bands from the region that Schuller treats include Jesse Stone's Blues Serenaders, Troy Floyd's orchestra, Walter Page's Blue Devils, and Alphonso Trent's orchestra.

Additionally, the chapter offers analyses of some of the tiny number of recordings available from other regional figures, Schuller commenting on the large number of "excellent orchestras" playing there at the time. Schuller concludes his discussion by analyzing Moten's 1932 Camden recording session, which puts the listener "in the world of the Basie band of later years," and "produced a rhythmic revolution comparable to Armstrong's earlier one."

=== 7. The Ellington Style: Its Origins and Early Development ===
This final chapter begins with some biographical material on Duke Ellington. It then provides an extended treatment of his orchestra: Ellington's early compositions, and the orchestra's performance opportunities, its personnel and their varied playing styles, and analyses of their recordings during the period. As usual, Schuller points out both effects that work well and those that are less well conceived or executed. As he notes, Ellington used the idiosyncrasies of his players' styles to fashion a sound that was unique to his orchestra.

=== Additional materials ===
The book closes with the transcript of an interview that Schuller conducted with the Denver violinist and band leader George Morrison. Morrison describes playing jazz in Denver before 1920, employing figures who became important later, such as Andy Kirk and Jimmie Lunceford. The interview backs up Schuller's contention that early jazz was widespread, beyond just the urban centers often associated with its beginnings. A glossary of pertinent music terms from both jazz and classical music follows, then a selected discography and an index. There are no endnotes, as footnotes appear throughout.

== Reception ==
Reviewers in both the popular and academic press acclaimed Early Jazz at the time of its publication. In the New York Times Book Review, Frank Conroy wrote: "Here, at last, is the definitive work."

In the Music Library Association publication, Notes, Frank Tirro wrote: "Gunther Schuller's work is the best musical account of jazz through the early 1930s yet published."

In a review in Journal of the American Musicological Society, William W. Austin wrote: "Schuller knows his subject as probably no one else does."

In a review in The American Historical Review, George A. Boeck wrote: "Gunther Schuller's history of early jazz is the most scholarly and perceptive work on the subject to date."

Some twenty years later, in a review of The New Grove Dictionary of American Music in Music and Letters, Peter Dickinson wrote: "Gunther Schuller set standards in his Early Jazz: its Roots and Musical Development in 1968."
