= The Red Back Book =

Scott Joplin: The Red Back Book

Studio album by New England Ragtime Ensemble
- Released: 1973
- Recorded: February 1973
- Venue: Jordan Hall
- Genre: Jazz
- Length: 36:18
- Label: Capitol Records
- Producer: George Sponhaltz

Scott Joplin: The Red Back Book is an album by the New England Ragtime Ensemble conducted by Gunther Schuller featuring the music of Scott Joplin arranged by E.J. Stark and D.S. De Lisle. The "Red Back Book" of the album title is taken from the popular name for the collection of band arrangements of ragtime music featuring Joplin's music, "Standard High-Class Rags" published by the Stark Music Company of St. Louis around 1912. The name came from the red color of the front and back cover.

== Reception ==
The Allmusic review by Scott Yanow stated "Hearing Joplin's music interpreted by a group consisting of trumpet, trombone, clarinet, flute/piccolo, tuba, piano, bass, drums and a string quartet helps cast new light on these vintage themes." The Red Back Book earned a Grammy Award for Best Chamber Music Performance of 1973. It spent 54 weeks on Billboard's Top 100 Albums List.

== Track listing ==
All music by Scott Joplin arranged by E.J. Stark and D.S. De Lisle for chamber ensemble.

1. "The Cascades" – 3:27
2. "Sun Flower Slow Drag" – 3:07
3. "The Chrysanthemum" – 3:44
4. "The Entertainer" (solo piano version) – 3:51
5. "The Ragtime Dance" – 4:00
6. "Sugar Cane" – 3:20
7. "The Easy Winners" – 3:56
8. "The Entertainer" – 4:15
9. "Sun Flower Drag" (solo piano version) – 3:27
10. "Maple Leaf Rag" – 3:11

== Personnel ==
- Charles Lewis – trumpet
- Victor Sawa – clarinet
- Ray Cutler – trombone
- David Reskin – flute and piccolo
- Gary Ofenloch – tuba
- Myron Romanul – piano
- Mark Belair – drums
- Juan Ramirez-Hernandez – 1st violin
- Tibor Pusztai – 2nd violin
- Juan Dandridge – viola
- Bruce Coppock – cello
- Michael Singer – bass
- John Van Hamersveld – Cover Art
