= Folk ragtime =

Folk ragtime is a subgenre of ragtime, a distinctly American music. It is sometimes referred to as a "school" of ragtime, or "strains" of ragtime.

It is thought to have originated with illiterate itinerant African American piano players, who learned the syncopated music not formally, but through their peers. Folk Ragtime as a form stayed active until the early 1920s, when young America shifted its attention to early jazz. It was later revived, beginning in 1947 with the 'rediscovery' of Sanford Brunson Campbell (March 20, 1884 - November 23, 1952), who was one of the most noted folk ragtimers and a student of Scott Joplin.

Later came, in the early 1960s, the then foremost authority on Folk Ragtime, Trebor Jay Tichenor (1940-2014). Another exponent of folk ragtime was Thomas Shea (November 14, 1931 - March 12, 1982); his music is sometimes referred to as "prairie ragtime."

== Structure ==
The writers of folk ragtime often mixed their themes together at random, in a structure loosely resembling the typical Classic Rag structure (IntroAABBACCDD). A good testament to this is the legendary multiple takes of Folk Rags by Sanford Brunson Campbell, recorded on acetate in 1947. They illustrate a performer who embellishes and improvises on basic themes, at times seeming as if he is making it all up as he goes along.

In terms of melodic and harmonic content, Folk Rags have a distinct blues influence. In addition to themes based on 12-bar patterns, the non-blues-structured themes almost incorporate flatted 'blue' notes. Many themes in Folk rags are based on tonic-dominant chord relations, with forays into other simple chords. A typical chord progression in B♭ major would go:

B♭|B♭|E♭|E♭|B♭|B♭|F7|F7|B♭|B♭|E♭|E♭|B♭|F7|B♭|B♭ :||

I |I |IV|IV|I |I |V7|V7|I |I |IV|IV|I |V7|I |I :||

At the center of the revival of folk ragtime has been historian, collector, and composer/pianist Trebor Jay Tichenor. His modern interpretations of Folk Ragtime, as well as his original compositions in the style, have set the standard for all folk ragtime pianists today. Some of his noted works are: "Hickory Smoked Rag" (1974), "Days Beyond Recall" (circa. 1960), and "Pierce City Rag" (circa. 1961), among many others.
