= Jordan Hall (Boston) =

Concert hall in Boston, Massachusetts

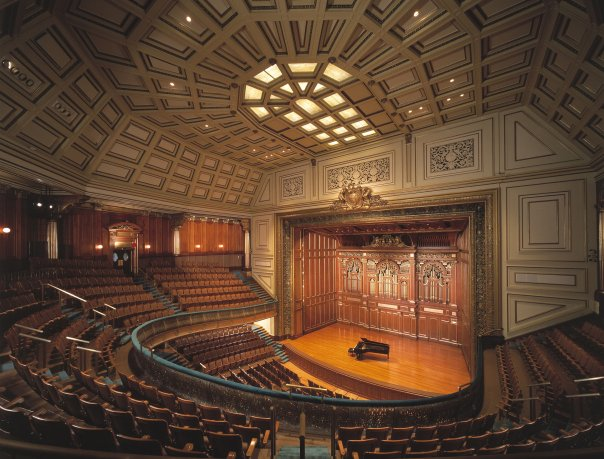
- Jordan Hall; NEC's principal performance space

- Location within Massachusetts Location within the United States
- Address: 290 Huntington Ave.
- Location: Boston, Massachusetts
- Coordinates: 42°20′28″N 71°5′11″W
- Owner: New England Conservatory of Music
- Capacity: 1,051
- Type: Concert hall
- Public transit: Massachusetts Avenue, Symphony

Construction
- Built: 1903
- Renovated: 1995

Tenant
- From the Top

Website
- necmusic.edu/jordan-hall
- Jordan Hall
- U.S. Historic district – Contributing property
- U.S. National Historic Landmark District – Contributing property
- Area: 1 acre (0.40 ha)
- Architect: Wheelwright & Haven
- Architectural style: Renaissance
- Part of: New England Conservatory of Music (ID80000672)

Significant dates
- Designated CP: May 14, 1980
- Designated NHLDCP: April 19, 1994

Jordan Hall is a 1,051-seat concert hall in Boston, Massachusetts, the principal performance space of the New England Conservatory. It is one block from Boston's Symphony Hall. The building within which Jordan Hall is housed is a National Historic Landmark and is currently under study by the Boston Landmarks Commission for landmark status.

== Design ==
Its architect was Edmund M. Wheelwright of Boston's Wheelwright & Haven, who later designed nearby Horticultural Hall. The hall's unusual square floor plan reflects its underlying plot of land but despite its shape, the hall has excellent acoustics, and all seats on both the main floor and horseshoe-shaped balcony have unobstructed views of the stage. The hall's prominent organ is modeled upon one found in a church within the former hospital complex of Santa Maria della Scala in Siena.

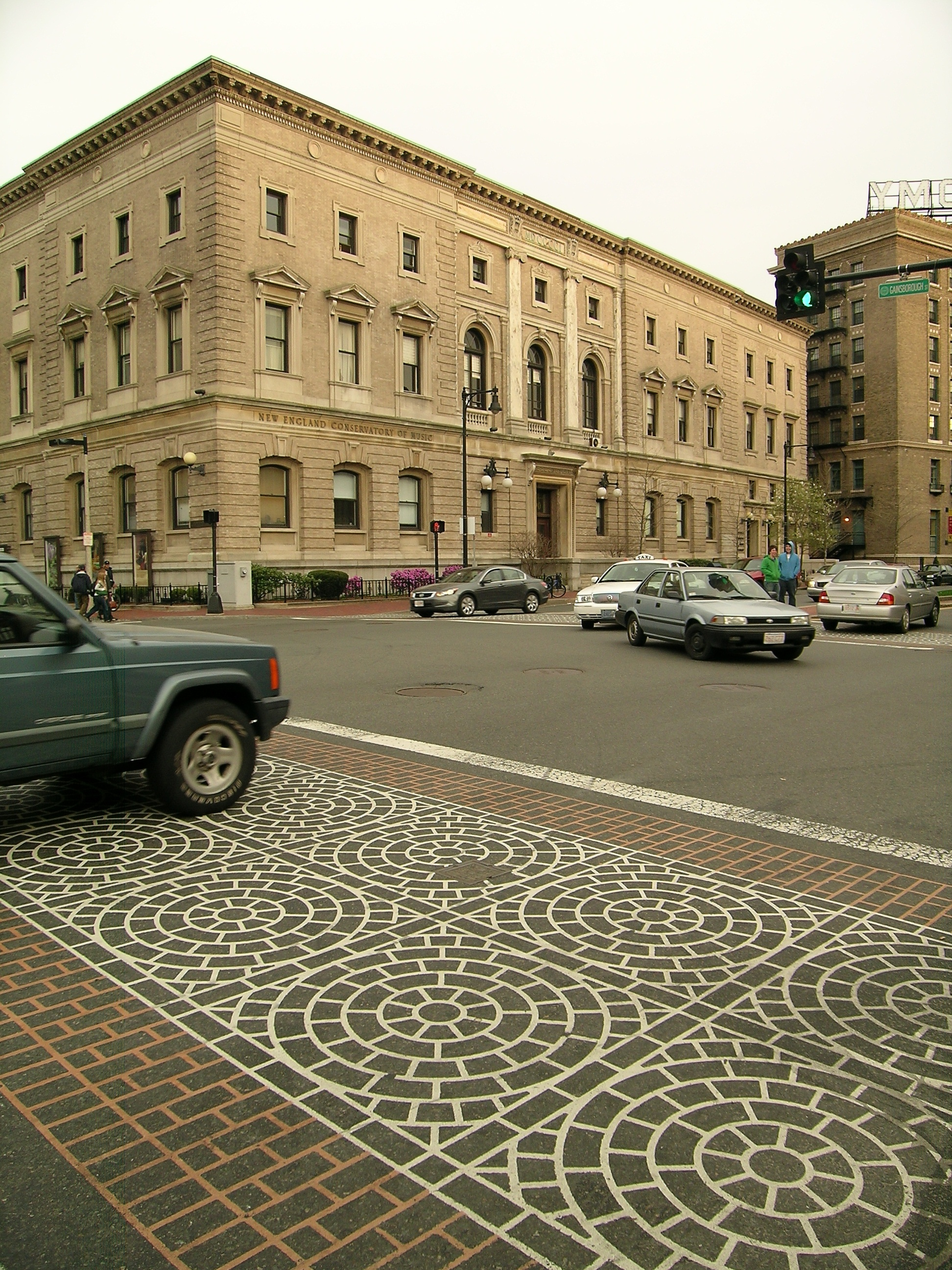
Exterior facade of Jordan Hall from Huntington Avenue

== History ==
The hall opened in 1903, as a gift of Eben D. Jordan II, a Conservatory trustee and son of the founder of the Jordan Marsh store.

The dedication concert, performed by the Boston Symphony Orchestra, was held October 20, 1903. Newspaper accounts deemed the hall "unequaled the world over," and The Boston Globe reported that it was "a place of entertainment that European musicians who were present that evening say excels in beauty anything of the kind they ever saw." Even a decade later, it describes itself as an "imposing Conservatory Building".

== Recognition and restoration ==
The Hall was restored in 1995 and has since won awards, including the 1996 Massachusetts Historical Commission Preservation Award, the Victorian Society in America's Preservation Commendation, the 1996 Boston Preservation Alliance Award, the Illuminating Engineering Society of North America Award of Merit, and the Illuminating Engineering Society 1996 Lumen Award. The Conservatory's main building, which includes Jordan Hall, was added to the National Register of Historic Places in 1980 and designated a National Historic Landmark in 1994; in both cases the name used is "New England Conservatory of Music."

== Performance space ==
Many performances have taken place in Jordan Hall, including some 650 student performances a year as well as appearances by virtually every important classical musician of the past century. That list includes performers Nadia Boulanger, Pablo Casals, the Martha Graham Dance Company, James Galway, pianists Arthur Rubinstein, Cyril Scott, Ferruccio Busoni, Vladimir de Pachmann, Angela Hewitt, Radu Lupu, Rudolf Serkin, Richard Goode, Krystian Zimerman, Garrick Ohlsson, Yundi Li, clarinetist Richard Stoltzman and violinist Isaac Stern; vocalists Marian Anderson, Peter Pears, Dawn Upshaw, Beniamino Riccio, Ben Heppner, David Daniels, and Lorraine Hunt Lieberson; guitarists Andrés Segovia, Christopher Parkening, Julian Bream, and Sérgio and Odair Assad; conductors Arthur Fiedler and Kurt Masur; composers Béla Bartók, Benjamin Britten, John Cage, Olivier Messiaen, and Aaron Copland; jazz legends Stan Getz and Benny Goodman; The Yale Whiffenpoofs; and the Budapest, Juilliard, Guarneri and Tokyo string quartets.

Jordan Hall is home to From the Top, a National Public Radio classical music show hosted by New England Conservatory alumnus Christopher O'Riley. In addition, the Boston Modern Orchestra Project, New England String Ensemble, Festival Youth Orchestra, the Boston Civic Symphony, and the Boston Philharmonic play many of their concerts at Jordan Hall. The Boston Gay Men's Chorus hosts a series of holiday concerts in Jordan Hall each year. In 1973, The New England Ragtime Ensemble, then a student group called The New England Conservatory Ragtime Ensemble, recorded their Grammy Award-winning album "The Red Back Book" on the Jordan Hall stage.
