= Trebor Jay Tichenor =

American writer (1940–2014)

Trebor Jay Tichenor (January 28, 1940–February 22, 2014) was a recognized authority on Scott Joplin and the ragtime era. He collected and published others' ragtime piano compositions and composed his own. He authored books about ragtime, and both on his own and as a member of The St. Louis Ragtimers, became a widely known ragtime pianist.

== Biography ==
Trebor Jay Tichenor was born in St. Louis, to Robert and Letitia Tichenor. His first name was formed by reversing the letters in his father's first name. He studied piano from the age of five and was influenced by hearing the ragtime piano playing of his mother in her band, Lettie's Collegiate Syncopators.

During the early 1950s, Lou Busch adopted the personality of Joe "Fingers" Carr, and made a series of ragtime recordings. These recordings mightily influenced Trebor's interests in the direction of ragtime. According to the noted sources, in the time frame from the mid-1950s to the early 1960s, when Tichenor wasn't acquiring first a high school degree from Country Day School (1958) and then a bachelor of arts from Washington University in St. Louis (1963), he was spending his time acquiring notable collections of original ragtime sheet music and piano rolls and making contact with the active members and legends of the continuing ragtime tradition.

By 1960, Tichenor's house had become renowned in the area as a place where one could hear hours of excellent music by both amateur and professional ragtime musicians. He received encouragement to himself become a professional musician. In 1966 he married Jeanette. They had two children, Virginia (1966) and Andy (1969). Jeanette died in 1986.

In December 2013, Tichenor suffered cerebral hemorrhage that left him debilitated and hospitalized. In the process of recovery, he died at LaClede Groves Rehabilitation Center on the afternoon of February 22, 2014.

== Professional career ==
=== Performance ===
In the Fall of 1961 and with three other musicians, Al Stricker (voice, banjo), Don Franz (tuba), and Bill Mason (trumpet), Tichenor formed the ragtime group known as the St. Louis Ragtimers, still performing in 2010. They performed on the weekends in Gaslight Square during the first half of the 1960s. Starting in 1965, the St. Louis Ragtimers began to perform on the Goldenrod Showboat. According to Terry Waldo, the Ragtimers' forte is the performance of folk ragtime and ragtime songs which reflect the spirit and humor of the ragtime era. The tables at the end of this article show that Tichenor regularly recorded ragtime music, both solo and with others, during a period of over 52 years, starting in 1962. For decades, Tichenor and the St. Louis Ragtimers appeared at various early jazz and ragtime festivals throughout the United States, notably the Scott Joplin International Ragtime Festival and the West Coast Ragtime Festival.

=== Expertise and publication ===
Tichenor was an acknowledged expert on aspects of ragtime and the ragtime era. He co-founded and co-edited the Ragtime Review in 1961. He co-authored an article on ragtime piano rolls. Various authors have noted that he had either the largest collection of ragtime piano rolls in the world, or one of them. In addition, he often made his significant collection of ragtime piano sheet music available, e.g., as in the publication of a definitive, two-volume set of Scott Joplin's collected rags. His relatively early conversations with ragtime figures such as Bob Darch and Arthur Marshall have led to discoveries in the history of ragtime. Attendant on the film The Sting, popular interest in ragtime was powerfully renewed. During his performance years at the Showboat Goldenrod, Tichenor did a brief stint around 1971 at community radio station KDNA-FM, St. Louis. In a one-hour weekly program, he introduced the radio audience to the history of ragtime. He contributed two volumes of a total of 127 rags which gave a broader perspective on the kind and quality of ragtime piano music of the years between 1897 and 1917. Ragtime Rarities was published in 1975, and Ragtime Rediscoveries was published in 1979. With David A. Jasen, in 1978 Tichenor published a widely read compendium Rags and Ragtime: A Musical History. Tichenor has also written a number of short articles for various ragtime publications under the topics ragtime history, ragtime figures, and ragtime piano repertory. Finally, he has himself been the subject of various short articles as well as bibliographical citations. Tichenor had the weekly radio program Ragophile in St. Louis from 1973-1987. He taught the Ragtime course for many years as a Lecturer in Music at Washington University.

=== Composition ===
Tichenor began composing his own brand of country ragtime, completing about 2 dozen of them in a 25-year period. He was an acknowledged exponent of this folk ragtime. His three folios of rags are noted at the end of this article.

== Solo Recordings ==
Title	ID	Place/Date
Mississippi Valley Ragtime	Ragophile TS81-1221; LP	Recorded on Goldenrod Showboat, March 1966
King of Folk Ragtime	Dirty Shame Records DSR 2001; LP	Recorded in Tichenor's home, 1973
Days Beyond Recall	Folkways FW03164; LP	Recorded in 1979
Tempus Ragorum	Stomp Off Records 1282; CD	Released in 1994
Those Southern Blues	PianoMania Music PM120; CD	Released in 1995
Wildflower Rag	PianoMania Music PM135; CD	Released in 1999.

== Recordings with others ==
Title	ID	Place/Date
The St. Louis Ragtimers' First Major Appearance	Ragophile Collectable SeriesTS81-359/360; LP	recording of the band's first major appearance, September 30, 1961, in Pierce City, Missouri
The St. Louis Ragtimers	Audiophile AP 75; LP	Recorded in 1962
The St. Louis Ragtimers Volume 2	Audiophile AP 81; LP	Recorded in 1964
The St. Louis Ragtimers Volume 3	Paseo Stereo DF 102; LP	
The St. Louis Ragtimers Volume 4	Audex Stereo AX 102; LP	Recorded in 1973
The St. Louis Ragtimers Volume 5	Audiophile AP 122; LP	Recorded in 1977
The St. Louis Ragtimers Volume 6 "Early Portraits"	Technisonic TS80-46-47; LP	Recorded September 29, 1979
The St. Louis Ragtimers Volume 7	Ragophile TSLR-007; LP	Recorded September 6, 1986
The St. Louis Ragtimers "Full Steam Ahead and Loaded Up"	Stomp Off Records 1267; CD	Recorded in 1993
57 Diff'rent Kinds of Blues	PianoMania Music PM130; CD	1996. Tichenor contributed one track.
Virginia's Favorites	PianoMania Music PM133A; CD	Recorded in 1996. Tichenor plays 4 tracks with daughter Virginia.
The Family Album - The Tichenor Family Trio	Ragophile 1002; CD	Recorded in 2000.
A Circle of Friends - Friends of Scott Joplin	FOSJ-001; CD	Recorded in 2002. Tichenor contributed two tracks.
Ragtime Reunion - The Tichenor Family Five	Ragophile 1003; CD	Recorded in 2004.
Music of the 1904 St. Louis World's Fair: Meet Me at the Fair	Gaslight Records GSL-S102; CD	Released in 2004. Tichenor contributed one track.

== Music folios ==
- Tichenor, T (1996). "Tempus Ragorum", Morgan Publishing.
- Tichenor, T (2002). "Mississippi Valley Ragtime", Morgan Publishing.
- Tichenor, T (2005). "Missouri Rags", Morgan Publishing.

== See also ==
- List of ragtime composers
