= New England Ragtime Ensemble =

The New England Ragtime Ensemble (originally The New England Conservatory Ragtime Ensemble) was a Boston chamber orchestra dedicated to the music of Scott Joplin and other ragtime composers.

== History ==
Conservatory president Gunther Schuller created the 12-member student ensemble in 1972 for a festival of romantic American music, at which the group performed some of Schuller's own editions of orchestrated versions of Joplin's piano rags. These period arrangements from the collection "Standard High-Class Rags", commonly known in early accounts as the Red Backed Book (later shortened to The Red Back Book), had been preserved by New Orleans musician Bill Russell and forwarded to Schuller by pianist and music historian Vera Brodsky Lawrence. In 1973 the group's performance at the Smithsonian Institution led to a recording for Angel Records. Orchestrations for later repertoire included oboe, bassoon, French horn and guitar and banjo, a routine period practice.

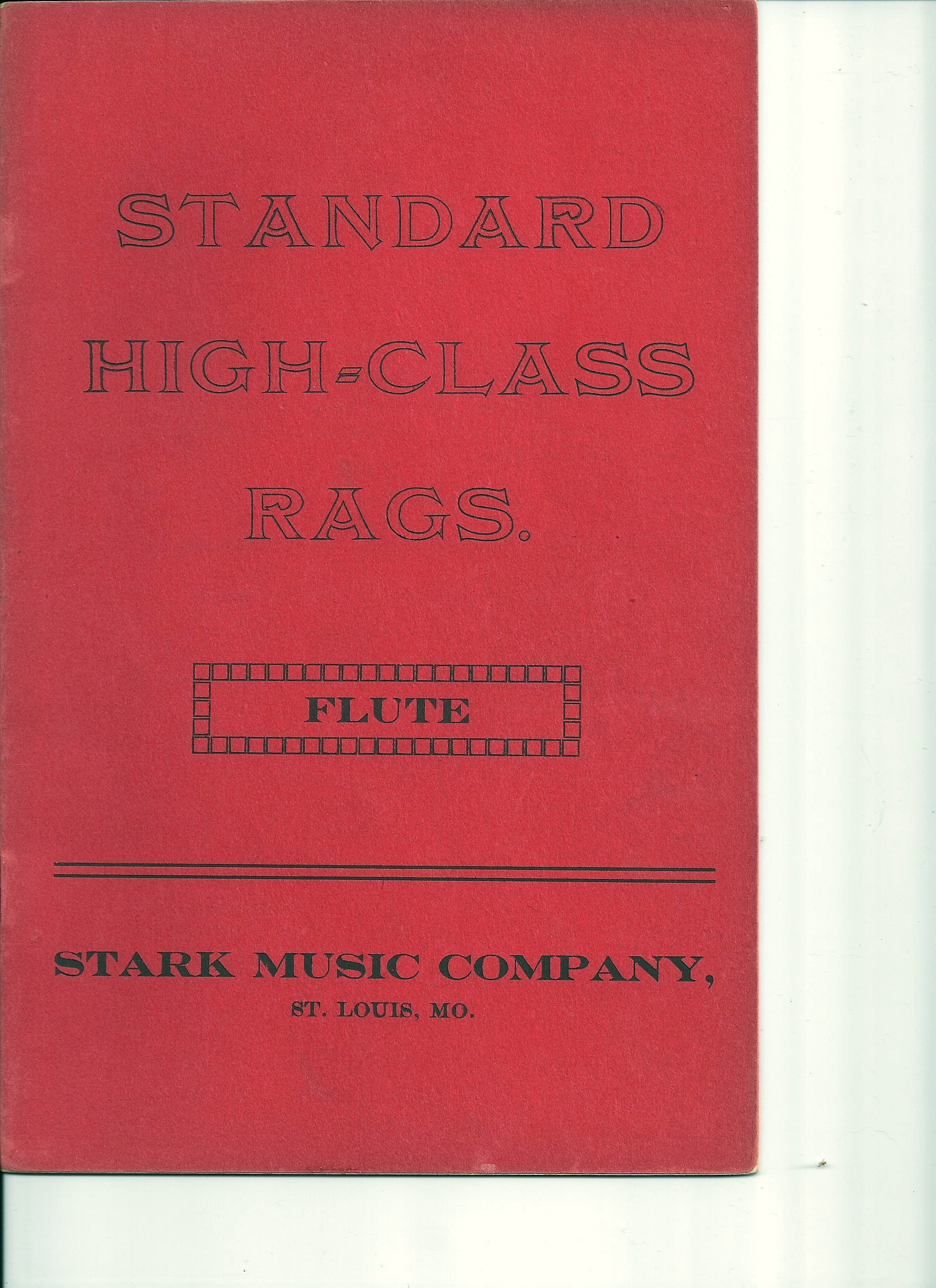
The flute part to "The Red Back Book" ca. 1912

"The Red Back Book" earned a Grammy Award for Best Chamber Music Performance of 1973. It spent 54 weeks on Billboard's Top 100 Albums List; 84 weeks on the Top Classical Albums List, including 6 separate appearances at #1; and 12 weeks on the Top Jazz Album List. It was the magazine's Top Classical Album of 1974.

The ensemble's second recording, "More Scott Joplin Rags", spent 26 weeks on the Top Classical list, earning a #7 ranking for 5 weeks.

Beginning in 1973 the ensemble began a tour of major American and Canadian venues, including sold-out performances at Wolf Trap National Park for the Performing Arts, where they would play seven more times; Tanglewood; the Blossom Music Center and the Ravinia Festival; the Newport Music Festival; the Saratoga Performing Arts Center as well as headlining the inaugural Scott Joplin Ragtime Festival in Sedalia, Missouri.

Following a series of performances in The Netherlands, in September 1974 they performed at a state dinner at the White House for President and Mrs. Gerald Ford.

President Ford and the New England Conservatory Ragtime Ensemble

From the program for the second annual Gunther Schuller Legacy Concert in New England Conservatory's Jordan Hall on Nov. 19, 2018

The group continued to concertize extensively after 1974, becoming independent of the conservatory when Schuller left the school in 1977. He expanded their repertoire, adapting existing arrangements as well as arranging and transcribing the music of James Scott, Joseph Lamb, Louis Chauvin, Arthur Marshall, James Reese Europe, Jelly Roll Morton, Zez Confrey, and Claude Debussy. Schuller later incorporated contemporary rags by William Albright, Stefan Kozinski, Kenneth Laufer, Rob Carriker, David Reffkin, and one of his own compositions, Sandpoint Rag.

Subsequent travel took the ensemble to 38 states and included performances at Symphony Hall, Boston; Alice Tully Hall;Carnegie Hall; the National Academy of Sciences (as part of the Jimmy Carter Inaugural Series); the John F. Kennedy Center for the Performing Arts; the Ambassador Auditorium; Louise M. Davies Symphony Hall; the New York Public Library for the Performing Arts at Lincoln Center; and Stanford University, Temple University and UCLA.

They appeared on WGBH-TV and WNAC (now WHDH) in Boston; WETA-TV in Washington DC; WTIC-TV in Hartford; KENW (TV), Portales, New Mexico; and performed live on NBC Today (Nov. 1, 1974) and A Prairie Home Companion (Jan. 18, 1986).

During these years tours took them to Canada, Italy, Norway, Portugal and the former Soviet Union.

Their final performance on July 16, 1998, brought them back to the stage on which they had debuted, Jordan Hall at The New England Conservatory.

On November 19, 2018, members of the original ensemble were joined by later players and students for the second annual Gunther Schuller Legacy Concert in Jordan Hall - a joint presentation of New England Conservatory and the Gunther Schuller Society.

== Members ==
=== The original ensemble ===
- Charles Lewis (trumpet)
- Victor Sawa (clarinet)
- Ray Cutler (trombone)
- David Reskin (flute and piccolo)
- Gary Ofenloch (tuba)
- Jaki Byard* (piano)
- Mark Belair (drums)
- Juan Ramirez-Hernandez (1st violin)
- Tibor Pusztai (2nd violin)
- Juan Dandridge (viola)
- Bruce Coppock (cello)
- Michael Singer (bass)

(* at the first performance only; Myron Romanul was the pianist for The Red Back Book and in ensuing concerts)

=== Other notable players ===
- Bo Winiker, Dennis Alves, and Thomas Smith (trumpet)
- Bruce Creditor, Don Byron, Diane Heffner, and Eric Thomas (clarinet)
- Thomas Foulds, Donald Sanders, Robert Couture, and Rick Chamberlain (trombone)
- Stephanie Jutt, Marianne Gedigian, and Julia Scolnik (flute and piccolo)
- Rob Carriker, Howard Johnson, Toby Hanks, and Harvey Phillips (tuba)
- Christopher O'Riley, John West, Randall Hodgkinson, Stefan Kozinski, Virginia Eskin, and Christopher Oldfather (piano)
- Lawrence Fried, Steve Ferrera, and George Schuller (drums)
- Amy Teare, Mary O'Reilly, Ann Ourada, Cyrus Stevens, Pattison Story, Susan Carrai, and David Reffkin (violin)
- Virginia Izzo and Leonard Matczynski (viola)
- Freya Oberle Samuels, Phoebe Carrai, and Shannon Snapp (cello)
- Edwin Barker, Richard Sarpola, and Ed Schuller (bass)
- Lynn Jacquin, Barbara Knapp, Sandra Apeseche, and Claudia Wann (oboe)
- Judith Bedford, Marlene Mazzuca, and Richard Sharp (bassoon)
- George Sullivan, Larry Ragent, Pamela Paikin, William Caballero, and Thomas Haunton (French horn)
- Paul Meyers, Marcus Fiorello, and Bob Young (guitar and banjo)

== Discography ==
=== As The New England Conservatory Ragtime Ensemble ===
- Scott Joplin: The Red Back Book (1973) Angel Records S-36060
- More Scott Joplin Rags (1974) Golden Crest CRS-31031
- The Road from Rags to Jazz (1975) Golden Crest CRS-31042

=== Reissues of The Red Back Book ===
- 1979 Angel SS-45029 (45 rpm LP minus piano solos)
- 1985 EMI/Angel CDC-7 47193 2 (CD including previous 45 rpm material as well as the reissue of the Southland Stingers' "Elite Syncopations")

=== As The New England Ragtime Ensemble ===
- The Art of the Rag (1989) GM Recordings GM3018CD
- The Art of Scott Joplin GM3030CD (reissue of More Scott Joplin Rags)

== Bibliography ==
- Jasen, David A. and Tichenor, Trebor Jay (1978) Rags and Ragtime: a Musical History. The Seabury Press; Dover Publications, Inc. ISBN 0-486-25922-6.
- Berlin, Edward A. (1980) Ragtime: a Musical and Cultural History. University of California Press. ISBN 0-520-03671-9.
- Hasse, John Edward, ed. (1985) Ragtime: its History, Composers and Music. Schirmer Books. Library of Congress Cat. # 84-13952. ISBN 0-02-871650-7.
- Berlin, Edward A. (1994). King of Ragtime: Scott Joplin and His Era. Oxford University Press. ISBN 0-19-508739-9.
- Jason, David A. (2007) Ragtime: an Encyclopedia, Discography, and Sheetography. Routledge Taylor and Francis Group. ISBN 0-415-97862-9.
- Waldo, Terry (2009) This is Ragtime. Jazz at Lincoln Center Library. ISBN 978-1-934793-01-5.
