= Brun Campbell =

American composer and pianist (1884–1952)

- Born: Sanford Brunson Campbell; March 26, 1884; Oberlin, Kansas, U.S.
- Died: November 23, 1952 (aged 68) Venice, California, U.S.
- Genres: Folk ragtime
- Occupations: Composer, musician, pianist
- Instrument: Piano
- Years active: 1899–1908, 1946–52

Brun Campbell (March 26, 1884 – November 23, 1952) was an American composer and pianist.

== Biography ==
Born Sanford Brunson Campbell in Oberlin, Kansas, he ran away to Oklahoma City when he was fifteen and met Scott Joplin. For the next decade, he made his living as a traveling pianist in the Midwestern and Southern United States. In 1908, he married and settled down to become a barber.

Toward the end of his life, he wrote about ragtime and made recordings. He died in Venice, California. He is buried at Valhalla Memorial Park Cemetery.

== Compositions ==
None of Campbell's compositions were copyrighted or published during his lifetime. However, they became known from recordings he made in the 1940s and early 1950s.

In 1993, Richard Egan, Jr. published Brun Campbell: The Music of "The Ragtime Kid", a collection of transcriptions of Campbell pieces.

In 2000, David Thomas Roberts recorded an album of Campbell's music, which was released on CD by Pianomania Music Publishing of Roseville, California.

- "Barber Shop Rag"
- "Blue Rag"
- "Campbell Cakewalk"
- "Chestnut Street in the 90s"
- "Essay in Ragtime"
- "Ginger Snap Rag"
- "Grandpa's Stomp"
- "Rendezvous Rag"
- "Tent Show Rag"
- "Reminiscences"
- "Slow and Easy"
- "Salome Slow Drag"
- "Brun's Slow Dog"
- "Short Rag"
- "Frankie and Johnny Rag"
- "Grandpa's Stomp"
- "Lulu White"
- "Barrelhouse Rag"

== In fiction ==
Larry Karp, who researched and wrote a biography of Campbell, also made him the subject of The Ragtime Kid and The Ragtime Fool, the first and third of a set of four historical novels he called "Ragtime Mysteries".

== See also ==
- List of ragtime composers

== Other sources ==
- Jasen, David A.; Trebor Jay Tichenor (1978). Rags and Ragtime: A Musical History. New York, NY: Dover Publications, Inc. pp. 52–55. ISBN 0-486-25922-6.
- "David Thomas Roberts – The Collected Brun Campbell". Archived from the original on June 2, 2014.
