= Fred Sherry String Quartet =

The Fred Sherry String Quartet is an American classical string quartet.

== Biography and career ==
The quartet was founded by cellist Fred Sherry to perform and record the four string quartets of Arnold Schoenberg. He appears on all recordings by the quartet. The other members of the quartet have varied over time. They have included:

- Jennifer Frautschi (violin), Jesse Mills (violin) and Richard O'Neill (viola) in the Concerto for String Quartet (recorded, 2002)
- Ida Kavafian (violin), Erin Keefe (violin) and Paul Neubauer (viola) in String Quartet No. 2 (recorded, 2005)
- Jennifer Frautschi (violin), Jesse Mills (violin) and Richard O'Neill (viola) in String Quartet No. 3 (recorded, 2007)
- Leila Josefowicz (violin), Jesse Mills (violin) and Paul Neubauer (viola) in String Quartet No. 4 (recorded, 2009)
- Leila Josefowicz (violin), Jesse Mills (violin) and Hsin-Yun Huang (viola) in String Quartet No. 1 (recorded, 2012)

Mr. Sherry also formed a string sextet consisting of Leila Josefowicz and David Chan (violins), Paul Neubauer and Yura Lee (violas) and himself and Michael Nicolas (cellos) for the recording of Schoenberg's Verklärte Nacht.

The Fred Sherry String Quartet has also recorded Schoenberg's Concerto for String Quartet and the Ode to Napoleon Buonaparte for Voice, Piano and String Quartet, Op. 41 as well as Anton Webern's String Quartet, Op. 28 and 6 Bagatelles, Op. 9.

== Recordings ==
- Schoenberg: Concerto for String Quartet / Das Buch der hangenden Garten (The Book of the Hanging Gardens) Naxos 8.557520 (2004)
- Schoenberg: 6 A Cappella Choruses / String Quartet No. 2 / Suite in G Major Naxos 8.557521 (2005)
- Schoenberg: Violin Concerto / Ode to Napoleon / A Survivor from Warsaw Naxos 8.557528 (2008)
- Schoenberg: String Quartets Nos. 3 and 4 / Phantasy Naxos 8.557533 (2010)
- Schoenberg: String Quartet No. 1 / Verklärte Nacht Naxos 8.557534 (2013)
- Webern: Vocal and Chamber Works Naxos 8.557516 (2015)
