= Richard Goode =

American classical pianist (born 1943)

Richard Stephen Goode (born June 1, 1943) is an American classical pianist who is especially known for his interpretations of Mozart and Beethoven.

== Early life ==
Goode was born in the East Bronx, New York. He studied piano with Elvira Szigeti, Claude Frank, and Nadia Reisenberg at Mannes College - The New School for Music (where he is a faculty member), and Rudolf Serkin and Mieczysław Horszowski at the Curtis Institute of Music in Philadelphia, Pennsylvania.

== Career ==
He has made many recordings, including several Mozart piano concerti with the Orpheus Chamber Orchestra and the music of Schubert, Schumann, Brahms, and Bach. Goode was the first American-born pianist to record the complete Beethoven piano sonatas. He regularly appears at the world's leading venues. He premiered works written for him by Carlos Chávez, George Perle, Robert Helps, and others. His chamber-music partners included Dawn Upshaw, Richard Stoltzman and Alexander Schneider.

From 1999 to 2013, Goode was the Artistic Co-Director of Marlboro Music School and Festival with Mitsuko Uchida.

Goode is married to violinist Marcia Weinfeld.

A literary portrait of Goode appears in David Blum's book Quintet: Five Journeys toward Musical Fulfillment (Cornell University Press, 1999). It originally appeared as an article in the 29 June 1992 issue of The New Yorker.

== Recognition ==
- Grammy Award for Best Chamber Music Performance:
  - Richard Goode & Richard Stoltzman for Brahms: The Sonatas for Clarinet & Piano, Op. 120 (1983)
- Recipient of Yale University's Sanford Medal.
- Young Concert Artists International Auditions in 1961
- First Prize in the Clara Haskil Competition in 1973
- Avery Fisher Prize in 1980.

== Discography ==
- Benita Valente, Richard Goode / Mozart • Schubert • Brahms • Hugo Wolf. - Benita Valente Sings Mozart Schubert Brahms Wolf (LP). Desmar, Telefunken. 1976
- Robert Schumann - Richard Goode - Humoreske, Op. 20 / Fantasia In C, Op. 17 Nonesuch. 1981
- Richard Stoltzman, Richard Goode - Brahms* - The Sonatas For Clarinet And Piano, Op. 120 RCA Red Seal. 1982
- Franz Schubert - Richard Goode - Sonata In A Major, D. 959 / Klavierstück In E Flat Minor, D. 946, No. 1 Nonesuch. 1985
- George Perle - Richard Goode, Music Today Ensemble, Gerard Schwarz - Serenade No. 3 For Piano And Chamber Orchestra / Ballade / Concertino For Piano, Winds And Timpani. Nonesuch. 1985
- Franz Schubert, Richard Goode - Schubert: Sonata In B-Flat Major, D. 960 Opus Posthumous • Allegretto D. 915 • Impromptu D. 935 No. 2 Elektra/Asylum/Nonesuch Records. 1985
- Richard Goode / Johannes Brahms - Richard Goode Plays Brahms Elektra Nonesuch. 1987
- Beethoven, Late Sonatas, Opus 101, 106 ( Hammerklavier ), 109, 110, 111 (2xLP, Album) Nonesuch Digital. 1988
- Schumann, Kathleen Battle, John Aler, Charles Wadsworth, Richard Goode - Spanische Liebeslieder, Andante And Variations, Piano Quartet (CD) ASV Digital. 1988
- Richard Stoltzman / Richard Goode : Schumann* / Schubert* - Fantasiestücke, Op. 73, 3 Romances, Op. 94 / 2 Sonatinas, D. 384, 385 (Cass, CrO) RCA Victor Red Seal. 1988
- Richard Stoltzman, Richard Goode, Lucy Chapman Stoltzman* - Bartok - Contrasts; Stravinsky - L'Histoire Du Soldat - Suite; Ives - Largo; Songs (Cass, Album). RCA Victor Red Seal. 1990
- Franz Schubert - Richard Goode - Sonata In C Minor, D. 958 • Ländler, Op. 171, D. 790 Elektra Nonesuch. 1992
- Mozart - Richard Goode, Orpheus Chamber Orchestra - Piano Concertos No. 18 & 20 (CD, Album) Nonesuch. 1996
- Chopin (CD, Album) Nonesuch. 1997
- Mozart - Richard Goode, Orpheus Chamber Orchestra - Piano Concertos No. 25 & 9 Nonesuch. 1998
- Richard Goode / Johann Sebastian Bach - Bach Partitas Nos. 4, 2, And 5 Nonesuch. 1999
- Mozart - Richard Goode, Orpheus Chamber Orchestra - Piano Concertos No. 23 & 24 (CD, Album) Nonesuch. 1999
- Mozart - Richard Goode, Orpheus Chamber Orchestra - Piano Concertos (No. 27 In B-flat Major, K.595 / No. 19 In F Major K.459) (CD) Nonesuch. 2000
- Bach Partitas Nos. 1, 3 & 6 Nonesuch. 2003
- Mozart Nonesuch. 2005
- Beethoven, Richard Goode, Ivan Fischer, Budapest Festival Orchestra - The Five Piano Concertos (3xCD + Box) Nonesuch. 2009
- Mozart - Richard Goode, Orpheus Chamber Orchestra - Piano Concertos (No. 17 In G, K.453 / No. 23 In A, K.488) (CD, Album) Nonesuch - 9 79042-2
- Beethoven, Richard Goode - The Complete Sonatas (10xCD + Box) Elektra Nonesuch, Book-Of-The-Month Records - 9 79328-2
