= Erick Friedman =

American violinist (1939–2004)

- Born: August 16, 1939; Newark, New Jersey
- Died: March 30, 2004 (aged 64) New Haven, Connecticut
- Instrument: Violin

Erick Friedman (August 16, 1939 – March 30, 2004) was an American violinist. He performed around the world as guest soloist with orchestras such as the New York Philharmonic, the Berlin Philharmonic, Orchestre de Paris, Chicago Symphony Orchestra, and the Boston Symphony Orchestra. He collaborated with conductors such as Karajan, Stokowski, Steinberg, Leinsdorf, Previn, and Ozawa. He won a Grammy Award in 1996.

== Early life ==
Friedman started playing the violin at age six. He attended Juilliard at age ten, and was the only violinist to be a private student of both Nathan Milstein and Jascha Heifetz. He began studies with Heifetz at age 17 at the University of Southern California and recorded the Bach Double Concerto with him in 1961.

In 1957 and 1983, he was a soloist with the Naumburg Orchestral Concerts, in the Naumburg Bandshell, Central Park, in the summer series.

== Career ==
Friedman worked as a concert artist and teacher, appearing with dozens of symphony orchestras throughout the world, and holding the positions of artist-in-residence at Southern Methodist and the Mischa Elman chair at the Manhattan School of Music.

In the early 1970s, Mr. Friedman was on the violin faculty of the North Carolina School of the Arts.

An automobile accident in the late 1980s injured his left hand. His first solo performance following his recovery was in Garrett County, MD for the Symphony at Deep Creek.

Friedman took a professorship at Yale University, where he stayed for the remainder of his life, holding several master classes. During this time, he judged at many competitions, was a conductor, and from 1986 to 1999, he was the music director and conductor for the Symphony at Deep Creek, a summer arts program with the Garrett Lakes Arts Festival. He has also taught at the Manhattan School of Music and Southern Methodist University.

== Violins ==
Most notably, Erick Friedman performed and recorded on an Antonio Stradivarius made in 1724, in Cremona, Italy, known as the 'Ludwig'. He also performed on two instruments in the 1970's made by Giuseppe Guarneri 'del Gesù' in Cremona, Italy; the 'Lafont-Siskovsky' made in 1733, and the 'Balokovic' circa 1725-1729.

== Awards ==
- Grammy in 1996 (38th Annual) for his participation in the release of a set of all of Heifetz's recordings for RCA Victor
- 2000 Ignace J. Paderewski Award for Distinguished Contributions to Society and Culture

== Death ==
Mr. Friedman died of lung cancer on Tuesday, March 30, 2004. He was teaching at Yale until the week before he died. His son, Brian, (not by Lu) and two grandchildren, Noah and Rachel, and his wife, Lu Sun Friedman, also a professional violinist.
