= Gunther Schuller =

American musician (1925–2015)

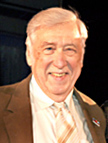
- Schuller in 2008

Background information
- Born: November 22, 1925; Queens, New York, U.S.
- Died: June 21, 2015 (aged 89) Boston, Massachusetts, U.S.
- Genres: Jazz; classical; third stream
- Occupation: President of the New England Conservatory
- Instruments: French horn; flute

Gunther Alexander Schuller (November 22, 1925 – June 21, 2015) was an American composer, conductor, horn player, author, historian, educator, publisher, and jazz musician.

== Biography and works ==
=== Early years ===
Schuller was born in Queens, New York City, the son of German parents Elsie (Bernartz) and Arthur E. Schuller, a violinist with the New York Philharmonic. He studied at the Saint Thomas Choir School and became an accomplished French horn player and flute player. At age 15, he was already playing horn professionally with the American Ballet Theatre (1943) followed by an appointment as principal hornist with the Cincinnati Symphony Orchestra (1943–45), and then the Metropolitan Opera Orchestra in New York, where he stayed until 1959. During his youth, he attended the Precollege Division at the Manhattan School of Music, later going on to teach at the school. But, already a high school dropout because he wanted to play professionally, Schuller never obtained a degree from any institution. He began his career in jazz by recording as a horn player with Miles Davis (1949–50).

=== Performance and growth ===
In 1955, Schuller and jazz pianist John Lewis founded the Modern Jazz Society, which gave its first concert at Town Hall, New York, the same year and later became known as the Jazz and Classical Music Society. While lecturing at Brandeis University in 1957, he coined the term "Third Stream" to describe music that combines classical and jazz elements. He became an enthusiastic advocate of this style and wrote many works according to its principles, among them Transformation (1957, for jazz ensemble), Concertino (1959, for jazz quartet and orchestra), Abstraction (1959, for nine instruments), and Variants on a Theme of Thelonious Monk (1960, for 13 instruments) utilizing Eric Dolphy and Ornette Coleman. In 1966, he composed the opera The Visitation. He also orchestrated Scott Joplin's only known surviving opera Treemonisha for the Houston Grand Opera's premiere production of this work in 1975.

=== Career maturity ===
In 1959, Schuller largely gave up performance to devote himself to composition, teaching and writing. He conducted internationally and studied and recorded jazz with such greats as Dizzy Gillespie and John Lewis among many others. Schuller wrote over 190 original compositions in many musical genres.

In the 1960s and 1970s, Schuller was president of New England Conservatory, where he founded The New England Ragtime Ensemble. During this period, he also held a variety of positions at the Boston Symphony Orchestra's summer home in Tanglewood, serving as director of new music activities from 1965 to 1969 and as artistic director of the Tanglewood Music Center from 1970 to 1984 and creating the Tanglewood Festival of Contemporary Music.

In the 1970s and 1980s Schuller founded the publishers Margun Music and Gun-Mar and the record label GM Recordings. Margun Music and Gun-Mar were sold to Music Sales Group in 1999.

Schuller recorded the LP Country Fiddle Band with the Conservatory's country fiddle band, released by Columbia Records in 1976. Reviewing in Christgau's Record Guide: Rock Albums of the Seventies (1981), Robert Christgau wrote: "The melodies are fetchingly tried-and-true, the (unintentional?) stateliness of the rhythms appropriately nineteenth-century, and the instrumental overkill (twenty-four instruments massed on 'Flop-Eared Mule') both gorgeous and hilarious. A grand novelty."

Schuller was editor-in-chief of Jazz Masterworks Editions, and co-director of the Smithsonian Jazz Masterworks Orchestra in Washington, D.C. Another effort of preservation was his editing and posthumous premiering at Lincoln Center in 1989 of Charles Mingus's immense final work, Epitaph, subsequently released on Columbia/Sony Records. He was the author of two major books on the history of jazz, Early Jazz (1968) and The Swing Era: The Development of Jazz, 1930-1945.

His students included Irwin Swack, Ralph Patt, John Ferritto, Mohammed Fairouz, Gitta Steiner, Oliver Knussen, Nancy Zeltsman, Riccardo Dalli Cardillo and hundreds of others. See: List of music students by teacher: R to S#Gunther Schuller.

=== Accomplishments in final decades ===
From 1993 until his death, Schuller served as artistic director for the Northwest Bach Festival in Spokane, Washington state. Each year the festival showcased works by J.S. Bach and other composers in venues around Spokane. At the 2010 festival, Schuller conducted the Mass in B minor at St. John's Cathedral, sung by the Bach Festival Chorus, composed of professional singers in Eastern Washington, and the BachFestival, composed of members of the Spokane Symphony and others. Other notable performances Schuller conducted at the festival include the St Matthew Passion in 2008 and Handel's Messiah in 2005.

Schuller's association with Spokane began with guest conducting the Spokane Symphony for one week in 1982. He then served as Music Director from 1984 to 1985 and later regularly appeared as a guest conductor. Schuller also served as artistic director to the nearby Festival at Sandpoint.

In 2005, the Boston Symphony, New England Conservatory, and Harvard University presented a festival of Schuller's music, curated by Bruce Brubaker, titled "I Hear America." At the time, Brubaker remarked, "Gunther Schuller is a key witness to American musical culture." His modernist orchestral work Where the Word Ends, organized in four movements corresponding to those of a symphony, was premiered by the Boston Symphony Orchestra in 2009.

In 2011 Schuller published the first volume of a two-volume autobiography, Gunther Schuller: A Life in Pursuit of Music and Beauty.

In 2012, Schuller premiered a new arrangement, the Treemonisha suite from Joplin's opera. It was performed as part of The Rest is Noise season at London's South Bank in 2013.

Schuller died on June 21, 2015, in Boston, from complications from leukemia. He married Marjorie Black, a singer and pianist, in 1948, and the marriage lasted until her death in 1992. His sons Ed (born 1955), a jazz bassist, and George (born 1958), a jazz drummer, survived him, as did his brother Edgar.

== Awards and honors ==
- Ditson Conductor's Award, 1970.
- Grammy Award for Best Chamber Music Performance, Joplin: The Red Back Book, 1974
- Grammy Award for Best Album Notes, Footlifters, 1976
- First place, Kennedy Center Friedheim Awards, 1987
- William Schuman Award for lifetime achievement, Columbia University, 1988
- MacArthur Foundation Genius grant, 1991,
- Lifetime achievement award, DownBeat magazine, 1993
- Lifetime achievement award, BMI Foundation, 1994
- Pulitzer Prize for "Of Reminiscences and Reflections", 1994
- Festival of his music performed by Boston Symphony and New England Conservatory, 2005
- National Endowment for the Arts (NEA) Jazz Masters Award, 2008<NEA Jazz Masters>
- Edward MacDowell Medal, MacDowell Colony, 2015

== Discography ==
=== As arranger ===
- John Lewis, The Modern Jazz Society Presents a Concert of Contemporary Music (Norgran, 1955)
- John Lewis, Django (Verve, 1955)
- Joe Lovano, Rush Hour (Blue Note, 1994)

=== As conductor ===
- Modern Jazz Quartet, Exposure (Atlantic, 1960)
- Dizzy Gillespie, Perceptions (Verve, 1961)
- John Lewis, Jazz Abstractions (Atlantic, 1961)
- Charles Mingus, Mingus Revisited (Limelight, 1960)
- Charles Mingus, Epitaph (Columbia, 1990)
- New England Ragtime Ensemble, Scott Joplin: The Red Back Book (Capitol, 1973)
- Houston Grand Opera, Scott Joplin: Treemonisha (Deutsche Grammophon, 1976)
- Gerard Schwarz, Turn of the Century Cornet Favorites (CBS/Columbia, 1977)

=== As a sideman ===
With Gigi Gryce

- Smoke Signal (Signal, 1955)
- In a Meditating Mood (Signal, 1955)
- Speculation (Signal, 1955)
- Kerry Dance (Signal, 1955)

all tracks appearing on "Nica's Tempo"

With John Lewis

- Odds Against Tomorrow (soundtrack) (United Artists, 1959)
- The Golden Striker (Atlantic, 1960)
- The Wonderful World of Jazz (Atlantic, 1960)
- Essence (Atlantic, 1962)

With Mitch Miller

- Conversation Piece (Columbia, 1951)
- Horns O' Plenty (Columbia, 1951)
- Horn Belt Boogie (Columbia, 1951)
- Serenade For Horns (Columbia, 1951)

With Frank Sinatra

- Come Back to Sorrento (Columbia, 1950)
- April in Paris (Columbia, 1950)
- I Guess I'll Have to Dream the Rest (Columbia, 1950)
- Nevertheless I'm in Love with You (Columbia, 1950)

With others

- Miles Davis, Birth of the Cool (Capitol, 1949/50, released 1957)
- Dizzy Gillespie, Gillespiana (Verve, 1960)
- Dizzy Gillespie, Carnegie Hall Concert (Verve, 1961)
- Johnny Mathis, "Prelude to a Kiss" (Columbia, 1956)
- Johnny Mathis, Fly Me to the Moon (In Other Words) (Columbia, 1956)
- Gerry Mulligan, Holliday with Mulligan (DRG, 1980)
- Julius Watkins, French Horns for My Lady (Philips, 1962)

== Books ==
- Gunther Schuller: A Life in Pursuit of Music and Beauty. University of Rochester Press, 2011.
- The Compleat Conductor. Oxford University Press, 1998.
- The Swing Era: The Development of Jazz, 1930–1945. Oxford University Press. 1991.
- Gunther Schuller: A Bio-Bibliography by Norbert Carnovale, Greenwood Publishing Group, 1987.
- Musings: The Musical Worlds of Gunther Schuller. Oxford University Press. 1986.
- Early Jazz: Its Roots and Musical Development. Oxford University Press. 1968. New printing 1986.
- Horn Technique. Oxford University Press, 1962. New Printing 1992.

== Bibliography ==
- Mark Tucker/Barry Kernfeld. The New Grove Dictionary of Opera, edited by Stanley Sadie (1992), ISBN 0-333-73432-7 and ISBN 1-56159-228-5
- Bruce Brubaker. "Surrounded by this Incredible Vortex of Musical Expression: A Conversation with Gunther Schuller", Perspectives of New Music, Volume 49, Number 1 (Winter 2011), pp. 172-181
