= Ford Dabney =

American pianist, bandleader, and composer (1883–1958)

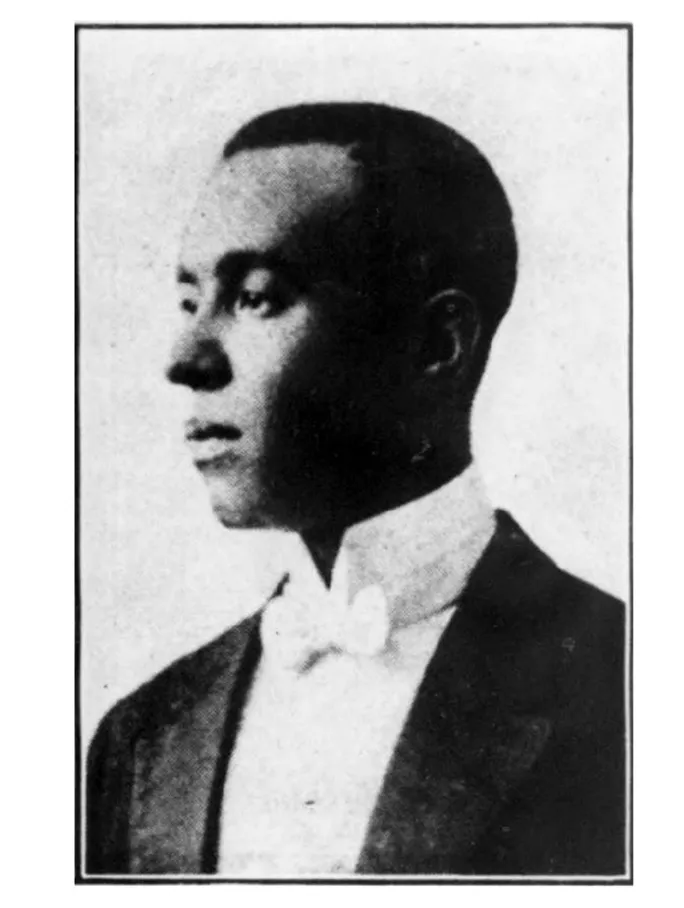
- Born: Ford Thompson Dabney; March 15, 1883; Washington, D.C.
- Died: June 6, 1958 (aged 75); Manhattan
- Education: Washington, D.C. M Street High School (1900–1902) Armstrong Manual Training School (1903)
- Spouse: Martha J. Davis (m. 1912) (maiden; 1877–1961), widow of boxer Joe Gans
- Parent(s): John Wesley Dabney (1851–1924) Rebecca C. Ford (maiden; 1854–1896)
- Musical career
- Occupations: Theater owner (film house and vaudeville), theater orchestra leader, bandleader, ragtime pianist, composer, arranger
- Years active: 1903–1944
- Labels: Paramount, Aeolian Vocalion, Belvedere, Puritan
- Formerly of: Ford Dabney's Syncopated Orchestra

Ford Thompson Dabney (15 March 1883 – 6 June 1958) was an American ragtime pianist, composer, songwriter, and acclaimed director of bands and orchestras for Broadway musical theater, revues, vaudeville, and early recordings. Additionally, for two years in Washington, from 1910 to 1912, he was proprietor of a theater that featured vaudeville, musical revues, and silent film. Dabney is best known as composer and lyricist of the 1910 song "That's Why They Call Me Shine," which for eleven point six decades, through 2025, has endured as a jazz standard. As of 2020, in the jazz genre, "Shine" has been recorded 646 times Dabney and one of his chief collaborators, James Reese Europe (1880–1919), were transitional figures in the prehistory of jazz that evolved from ragtime (which loosely includes some syncopated music) and blues – and grew into stride, boogie-woogie, and other next levels in jazz. Their 1914 composition, "Castle Walk" – recorded February 10, 1914, by Europe's Society Orchestra with Dabney at the piano (Victor 17553-A, Matrix: B-14434) – is one of the earliest recordings of jazz. (Note: "Livery Stable Blues," recorded February 26, 1917, and released March 7, 1917, is widely acknowledged as the first jazz recording commercially released. The 1914 Victor "Castle Walk" recording, when released, was neither recognized nor promoted as jazz, but rather, popular jazz-like dance music. Claims of others as the first jazz recordings include: 1. "My Hawaiian Sunshine" (©1916) by L. Wolfe Gilbert (w&m) and Carey Morgan (music), recorded by Wilbur Sweatman; Emerson 5166 (matrix 1200-1), December 1916; 2. "Too Much Mustard" (©1914) recorded by Europe's Society Orchestra, Ford Dabney on piano; Victor 35359 (matrix 14246-1), December 29, 1913; 3. "That Funny Jas Band from Dixieland" (©1916) by Gus Kahn (lyrics) and Henry I. Marshall (music), recorded by Collins & Harlan; Edison 50423 (matrix 5186-C-5-142), December 21, 1916)

== Career ==
=== Education ===
Dabney attended the business education division of Colored High School (aka M Street High School) in Washington, D.C., grades nine through eleven. Robert Heberton Terrell was the Principal. On June 22, 1901, Dabney was promoted from 1st year (grade 9) to 2nd (grade 10) for the fall of 1901. (Note: "Colored Pupils Advanced," Washington Times, No. 2584, June 23, 1901, p. 4 (accessible via Library of Congress, "Chronicling America")) This was the same school that James Reese Europe graduated from in 1902. Dabney then attended Armstrong Manual Training School in Washington. He sang in the church choir of St. Mary's Protestant Episcopal Chapel – a mission of St. John's Parish – 23rd Street, between G and H Streets, N.W. – the current campus of George Washington University.

Dabney studied music privately first with his father, John Wendell Dabney, then with his uncle, Wendell Phillips Dabney (1865-1952), then Charles Donch (né Charles Bernard Donch; 1858–1948), William Waldecker (1857–1931), an organist for several churches in Washington, and Samuel Fabian (né Samuel Monroe Fabian; 1859–1921), a concert pianist. (Note: "Washington Negro's Success as Pianist," Washington Times, No. 3490, December 31, 1903, p. 5 (accessible via Library of Congress, "Chronicling America")) (Note: "Men of the Month," The Crisis, Vol. 12, No. 1, May 1916, pp. 189–190)

=== 1901: New York ===
Dabney moved from Washington, D.C., to New York around 1901, two or three years before James Reese Europe moved there. In New York, Dabney studied music and played piano in parlors. He played many piano engagements in drawing rooms filled to capacity with prominent society. Dabney and Europe's early days in New York apparently overlapped because, reportedly, they often met at the Marshall Hotel in Midtown's Tenderloin District, at 127–129 West 53rd Street, between Sixth and Seventh Avenues – one of two avant-garde hotels for creative, intellectual black New Yorkers. James L. Marshall (1874–1925), (Note: "Jimmie Marshall, Famed as Proprietor of Hotel Marshall, 53rd St., in Days Gone By, Died in Canada Where He Lived," New York Age, April 11, 1925, p. 1 (accessible via Newspapers.com; subscription required)) with the assistance of his brother, George Marshall – both accomplished African-American bonifaces – operated the hotel from 1901 through 1914. (Note: Black Manhattan, by James Weldon Johnson (1871–1938), Alfred A. Knopf (1930), pp. 119–120; OCLC 123478573, 1136332654, 250997278; 7976035662) The Colored Vaudeville Benevolent Association (compare to White Rats of America), when founded in 1909, was headquartered right across the street at 320 West 53rd Street. The Clef Club – founded in 1910 by Europe, Dabney, and others – was initially headquartered next door, at 137 West 53rd Street, but eventually moved west two blocks to 334 West 53rd. St. Mark's M.E. Church, an African-American congregation, was one block east, at 231 West 53rd. The church flourished from 1895 to 1926.

That same neighborhood, one block south – 52nd Street, between 6th and 7th Avenues – contained, from the late 1930s until the early 1960s, a remarkable concentration of jazz night clubs.

=== Haiti ===
While in New York, Dabney won sponsorship of the Haitian consul to France, Joseph Jefford, who also was a special Haitian envoy to the United States. In the first week of January 1904, he sailed to Haiti to fill a four-month post as pianist to the president, Pierre Nord Alexis (1820–1910), for $4,000 (equivalent to $143,333 in 2025). His itinerary included a trip to France to play for President Émile Loubet, then to Germany. (Note: (no headline – first sentence) "The Afro-American is 'Making Good' . . . ," The Appeal, Vol. 20 No. 2, January 9, 1904, p. 2, col. 2 (of 7), middle (accessible via Library of Congress, "Chronicling America")) His appointment in Haiti was extended through 1907.

=== Dabney's Theater, Washington, D.C. ===
From around October 1910 through 1911, Dabney owned and operated a theater bearing his name, "Ford Dabney's Theater." It was located at the eastern edge of the Cardozo neighborhood, Washington, D.C., on the northeast corner of 9th and U Streets, N.W. (2001 9th Street, N.W.), around the corner from the current African American Civil War Memorial Museum. George W. Hamilton (1871–1910) was general manager. The theater's tagline in newspaper ads read, "Refined vaudeville and motion pictures."

In 1910, Dabney formed several touring vaudeville groups, among which, he and violinist Willie Carroll (né William Thomas Carroll; 1881–1943) conceived and produced Dabney's Ginger Girls, who first performed at his theater before going on the road. The Ginger girls were a duet: Lottie Gee (née Charlotte O. Gee; 1886–1973), dancer and soprano, and Effie King, dancer and contralto (photo in New York Age, June 12, 1913, p. 6 Newspapers.com; subscription required). Effie King was the stage name of Anna Green (maiden; 1888–1944), who in 1907, married actor Frank Henry Wilson (1885–1956).

When Dabney's theater manager Hamilton died December 10, 1910, (Note: The Washington Bee, August 13, 1910, p. 4 (accessible via Library of Congress, "Chronicling America") a) "Endorses the Theater," by William L. Smith, druggist 4th and Elm Streets, N.W. (LeDroit Park), col. 4 b) "The Chelsea Theater," col. 4) (Note: "George Hamilton Dead," The Washington Bee, Vol. 31, No. 29, December 17, 1910, p. 1 (accessible via Library of Congress, "Chronicling America")) James H. Hudnell took over as manager. Dabney's Theater received competition when the Hiawatha Theater, running vaudeville, opened in October 1910. It was also located in the Cardozo neighborhood at 2006-2008 11th Street, N.W. That theater ran until May 1922.

In October 1911, the New York Age published an announcement that Dabney had purchased the Chelsea Theatre at 1913 M Street, N.W. (between 19th and 20th Streets, N.W.). Louis Mitchell and J. West were the house managers. (Note: "Stageology at Capital City," by W.P.B., New York Age, October 19, 1911, p. 6, col. 5 (accessible via Newspapers.com; (subscription required); also accessible via www.fultonhistory.com; free)) One year earlier, around August 1910, S.L. Jones and L. Kohler Chambers (né Luddington Kohler Chambers; 1874–1913) acquired the Chelsea, which had been "formerly owned and managed by white people."

Two months later, around December 1, 1911, Dabney's Theater changed hands and James H. Hudnell became sole manager. (Note: "Theaters – Ford Dabney," The Washington Bee, Vol. 32, No. 26, December 2, 1911, p. 5, col. 3 (bottom) (accessible via Library of Congress, "Chronicling America")) He kept the name, "Dabney's Theater," but operated it as a motion-picture theater until January 1912, then added back vaudeville.

=== Career (continued) ===
In 1909, Dabney began composing and publishing songs, namely "Oh! You Devil" (©1909), "That Minor Strain" (©1910), "Haytian Rag" (©1911), and "Shine" (©1910). Dabney began working with James Reese Europe at the Clef Club in the 1910s, and together collaborated with Florenz Ziegfeld on his shows in New York City (including at the New Amsterdam Theater from 1913 to 1921). Europe and Dabney's collaborations included eight pieces to accompany the dancing of Vernon and Irene Castle. (Note: Lost Chords – the diverting story of American popular songs, by Douglas Gilbert (né Douglas L. Gilbert; 1889–1948), Doubleday, Doran (1942) (reprinted 1970) Cooper Square Publishers; OCLC 461403457; 978-0-8154-0370-8)

=== Dabney's Syncopated Orchestra ===
In 1917, Ford Dabney's Syncopated Orchestra began recording jazz. In August 1917, during their first session, they recorded 5 songs for Aeolian Vocalion, including "At the Darkdown Strutter's Ball," which featured vocalist Arthur Fields.

Dabney and his instrumentalists were black and Fields was white. According to historian Tim Brooks, that recording was "an early, and unusual example of a white vocalist recording with a black orchestra. Though not the first example of interracial recording, it was progressive for its time." Dabney, from 1919 through 1922, as pianist and leader, recorded 28 songs with Vocalion and Paramount.

Ziegfeld's Midnight Frolic

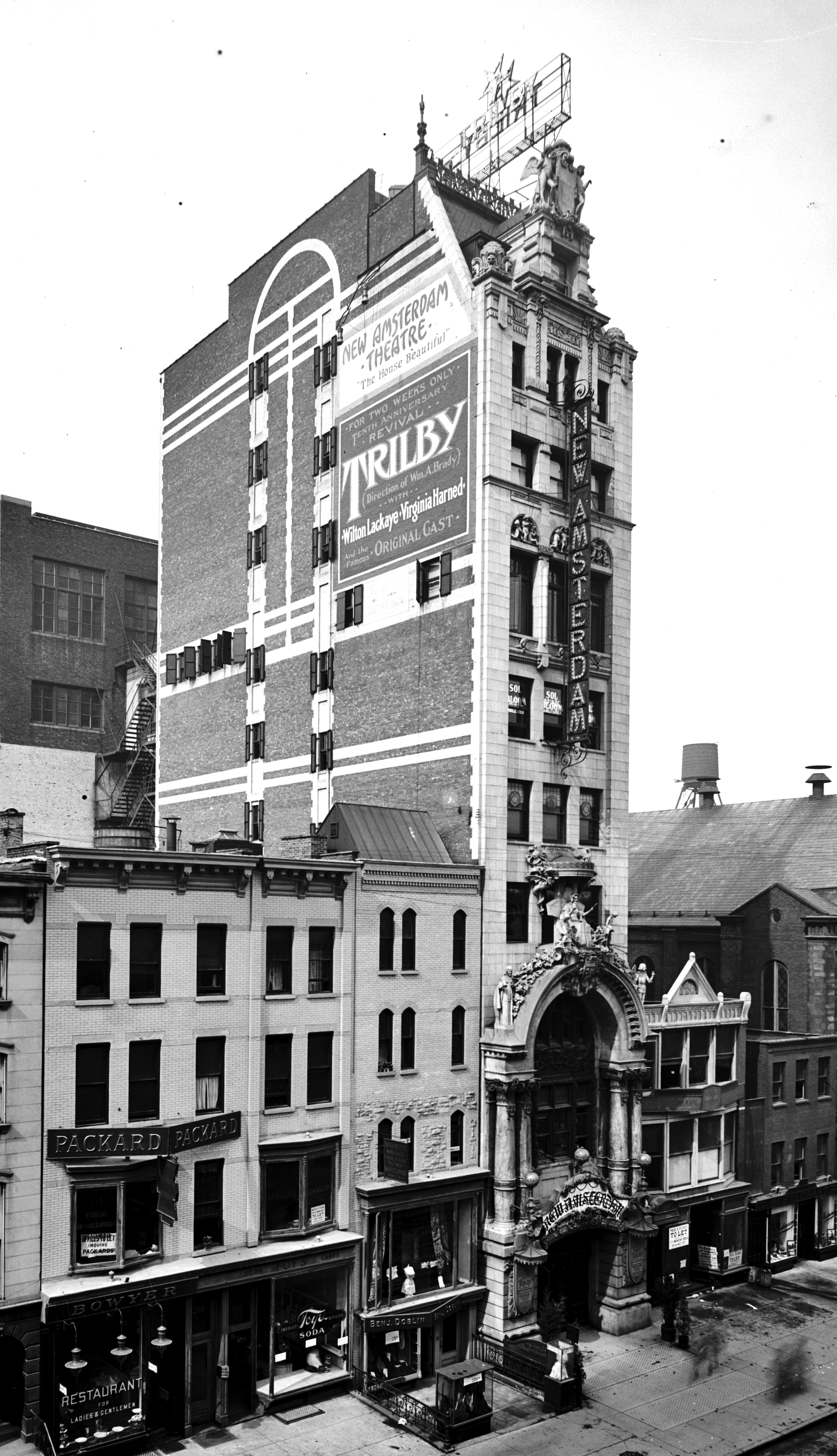
The New Amsterdam Theatre in 1905

Dabney, leading his own Syncopated Orchestra, was the musical director of Ziegfeld's Midnight Frolic for 8 years, from 1913 to 1921. The shows were in the Roof Garden Club of the New Amsterdam Theatre, where more risqué productions were presented. In that setting, his Syncopated Orchestra stands as the first black orchestra to play regularly in a Broadway Theater. (Note: "Show Business," column by Noble Sissle, "The Fabulous Ford Dabney," New York Age, March 26, 1949, p. 7 (accessible via Newspapers.com; subscription required; also accessible via www.fultonhistory.com; free))

In the summers, Dabney's orchestra performed at the Palais Royale in Atlantic City.

==== Known members of Dabny's Orchestra ====
1917

- Emporia-born Crickett Smith (1881–1947), trumpet
- Nappy Lee, tuba, euphonium (Note: Nappy Lee, nicknamed for his unkempt albeit likable hair, once performed with Wilbur Sweatman's Orchestra. Joe Jordan (1882–1971) composed in 1904 a song titled "Nappy Lee" (©1904), a slow drag, for mandolin orchestra in commemoration of Nappy Lee. Jordan sold it to a Des Moines publisher, J.E. Agnew (Joseph Erskine Agnew; 1868–1949). (Catalog of Copyright Entries, Class C, Musical Compositions, Vol. 40, No. 15, 1904; "Nappy Lee," © 28 March 1904; 2nd copy 22 January 1904; C67561, p. 145). "Nappy Lee," recorded December 15, 1903, was Jordan's first recording of a rag.) (Note: Father of the Blues – An Autobiography, by W. C. Handy, The MacMillan Company (©1941, 1942; reprint 1944))
- Detroit-born Edgar Campbell (né Edgar O. Campbell; born 1889), clarinet
- Louisville-born Alonzo Williams (né Alonzo Theodore Williams; 1888–1953), alto sax
- Raleigh-born John Haywood (né John Craven Haywood; 1877–1968), tuba, violin
- Georgia-born Dennis Johnson (né Dennis Alexander Johnson; born 1879), drums
- Brooklyn-born Allie Ross (né Alfred Wigg Ross; 1892–1933), violin (Note: "In the Name of ... " (obituary of Allie Ross), by Percy Outram, New York Age, September 2, 1933, p. 6 (accessible via Newspapers.com; subscription required) Note: Percy Outram (né Rowland Percival Outram; 1877–1957) was a Barbados-born musician and music columnist for the New York Age.)
- Manhattan-born Bernard "Buttercup" Parker (né Bernard Henry Parker; 1895–1975), violin
- Manhattan-born J. Nimrod Jones (né John Nimrod Jones, Jr.; 1880–1934), violin (Note: J. Nimrod Jones, Jr. (John Nimrod Jones, Jr.; 1880–1934) was born Leon Jones, but at some point, probably around 1903, he adopted his father's name, John Nimrod Jones, Jr.)
- Philadelphia-born Arthur Fields (1884–1953), vocalist

1922

- Philadelphia-born Arthur Fields (1884–1953), vocalist
- Baltimore-born Pike Davis (né Clifton Morris Davis; 1895–1976), trumpet
- Wesley Johnson, trumpet (Note: C. Wesley Johnson, cornetist, recorded from 1920 to 1922 in New York with Lucille Hegamin (1894–1970) and her Blue Flame Syncopators. He also served as president of the New Amsterdam Musical Association (N.A.M.A.). He was a founding member of the Clef Club. Johnson taught cello at the Colored Music Settlement School in Manhattan. The 1920 US Census enumerates Johnson as a student at Wilberforce University in Xenia, Ohio.)
- John Reeves, trombone
- Burlington, Ohio-born, Herschel Brassfield (né Hershel Lee Brassfield; 1895–1931), clarinet, alto sax
- Brooklyn-born Tracy F. Cooper (1892–1925), violin (Note: "Tracy F. Cooper Dead," New York Age, January 31, 1925, p. 9 (accessible via Newspapers.com; subscription required))
- Washington, D.C.-born Willie Carroll (né William Thomas Carroll; 1881–1943), violin
- Mose Ross (né Elwin Mose Ross; born 1 May 1891), drums

=== 1917: death of Vernon Castle ===
After the start of World War I, Vernon Castle – Dabney and Europe's employer – was determined to fight for England. He joined the Royal Flying Corps, trained as a pilot, but was killed in 1917 during flight training crash at Camp Taliaferro, near Fort Worth, Texas.

=== 1919: death of James Reese Europe ===
James Reese Europe served in World War I as a commissioned officer in the New York Army National Guard and fought as a lieutenant with the 369th Infantry Regiment (the "Harlem Hellfighters") when it was assigned to the French Army. Europe rapidly rose with great acclaim as director the 369 Regiment Band and returned to New York in 1919 as a war hero.

On May 9, 1919, Europe was performing in Boston at Mechanics Hall. During an intermission, he berated a snare drummer, Herbert B. Wright (born 1895), who became enraged and lunged at him, striking his neck with a pen knife in what seemed initially to be a minor nick. Even Europe dismissed it as a superficial wound. But, within a few hours it turned fatal. Wright was convicted of manslaughter and served 8 years of a 10-to-12-year sentence in the Massachusetts State Prison.

After Europe's death, Dabney continued leading his own ensembles, including Dabney's Band and Ford Dabney's Syncopated Orchestra, the latter of which recorded for Belvedere and Puritan Records. However, these endeavors were less successful, and in 1921 he lost his theater position on Broadway.

As a side note, when Wright was released on March 30, 1927, he, with his wife Lillie, went on to live in Roxbury, Boston, at 23 Haskins Street, working as an elevator operator, a danceband drummer, and a private drum teacher. Wright was the first music teacher for one particular 8-year-old Roy Haynes, who lived across the street at 30 Haskins. (Note: The Boston Directory for the Year Commencing August 1, 1933, Sampson & Murdock Company, Vol. 129 (1933); OCLC 27465586 "Wright, Herbert B. (Lillie)," p. 1834 "Haynes, Gustavus (Edna)," p. 942 (accessible via Ancestry.com; subscription required))

=== Dabney's career (continued) and death ===
After losing his job in 1921 at the New Amsterdam Theatre, Dabney continued working in New York, composing for three more decades. Notably, he scored all the music and co-wrote the lyrics for Rang Tang in 1927. His film credits include the 1934 film, Social Register, and the 1943 film, Stormy Weather (as consultant). Dabney operated an entertainment bureau, and for many years, performed engagements in West Palm Beach and Newport.

Dabney was close friends with the family of Associate Justice Thurgood Marshall and was an honorary pallbearer for the funeral of Marshall's first wife, Vivian Burey Marshall (1911–1955). (Note: "Thousands Mourn Wife of Thurgood Marshall," New York Age, Vol. 74, No. 49, February 19, 1955, pp. 1–2 (accessible via Newspapers.com; subscription required))

Dabney died June 6, 1958, in Manhattan, at the Sydenham Hospital – 2 months and 9 days after the death of W.C. Handy.

== Works ==
=== Songs and rags ===
1. "Call Me Dear" (©1908), words by Henry Creamer (1879–1930), music by Dabney, published by Francis, Day & Hunter Ltd. (Note: Vol. 3, August 1908, Nos. 32–35 (1908), p. 728, "Oh! You Devil," rag, for piano)
2. "You Can Learn the Hootchie-Kootchie for a Dollar and Thirty Cents" (©1908), words by Henry Creamer (1879–1930), music by Dabney, published by M. Witmark & Sons; featured in the 1909 production, The Blanche Ring Vaudeville Act (Note: Vol. 3, August 1908, Nos. 31–34 (1908), p. 792, "You Can Learn the Hootchie-Kootchie . . . ") (Note: Vol. 31, No. 4; April 1936 (1936), p. 585; "You Can Learn the Hootchie-Kootchie . . . ")
3. "Oh! You Devil" (©1909), rag for piano, by Dabney, was published by Maurice Shapiro. Dabney composed it as a quasi-ballet number for Aida Overton Walker, initially as part of his 1909 one-act operetta, The King's Quest. Its premiere is unclear. One account states that Aida Overton Walker introduced it in February 1909 as a dance in Chicago as part of a post-Broadway production of Bandanna Land billed as The New Bandanna Land or "the 2nd edition" of Bandanna Land. The publisher, on February 25, 1910, copyrighted a song version with words by E. Ray Goetz (1886–1954). (Note: Vol. 32, No. 3; March 1938 (1938), p. 382; "Oh! You Devil Rag") (Note: Vol. 4, August 1909, Nos. 31–34 (1909), p. 730, "Oh! You Devil," rag, for piano) "Oh! You Devil" became a favorite of the Clef Club Symphony Orchestra.

From His Honor the Barber (1909)

4. "That's Why They Call Me Shine" (©1910), R.C. McPherson (aka Cecil Mack) and Ford Dabney, publisher (Note: Vol. 5; December 1910, Nos. 48–52 (1910), p. 1565, "That's Why They Call Me Shine") words Cecil Mack, music by Dabney. (Note: Vol. 5, Part 5C, No. 1; January-June 1951 (1951), p. 65; "Shine") (Note: Vol. 5, Part 5C, No. 2; July-December 1951 (1951), p. 151; "S-H-I-N-E," Glogau arrangement)

The song debuted in S.H. Dudley's 1909 production of His Honor the Barber, with a notable production in 1911 at the Majestic Theater, currently the site of the Time Warner Center. Stars included Dudley and Aida Overton Walker (1880–1914), who sang "Shine."

According to songwriter Perry Bradford, the song was inspired by a real person named 'Shine' (possibly 'Kid Shine'), a street tough kid who was a friend of George Walker, and who was caught with Walker in the New York City race riot of August 1900.

David Krasner, in his 1995 article, "Parody and Double Consciousness in the Language of Early Black Musical Theatre," stated, "Not only do the lyrics echo themes in Paul Laurence Dunbar's 1895 poem 'We Wear the Mask,' the text signifies what Du Bois calls living a 'double life, with double thoughts, double duties, and double social classes ... ' The lyrics of 'Shine' draw our attention to the double consciousness of racial identity, and parody racism through inverting the position of the signifier. The signifier (Walker) inverts the signified (racial identification; i.e., names), subverting racist signification. 'Shine,' Richard Newman writes, 'is almost a song of social protest in its antiracism."

In 1924, fourteen years after "That's Why They Call Me Shine" was published, Lew Brown shortened the title to "Shine" and changed the lyrics from a black man singing about himself to a shoe shine man who has a sunny outlook. (Note: Vol. 19; May 7, 1924, Nos. 5–6 (1934), p. 555, "Shine," new lyrics) (Note: Vol. 19; April 18, 1924, Nos. 5–6 (1934), p. 555, "Shine," new lyrics, arranged by Jack Glogau (né Jacob A. Glogau; 1886–1953))

Songs (continued)

5. "Anoma," [characteristic] rag, Jerome H. Remick, publisher (©1910), (Note: Vol. 6; January 1911, No. 1 (1911), p. 6, "Anoma," piano rag) (Note: Vol. 33, No. 1; January 1938 (1938), p. 73; "Anoma")
  William Starmer or Frederick Starmer, cover art. (the anonym of "Anoma," in Haitian Creole, translates to "grandmother")
6. "The Pensacola Mooch" (©1910), Will Cook & Dabney (w&m), copyright by Cook, published by Harry Von Tilzer Music Publishing Co. (Note: Vol. 5; April 1910, Nos. 14–17 (1910), p. 553, "The Pensacola Mooch")
7. "Haytian Rag" (©1911), Jerome H. Remick & Co., publisher. The composition was copyrighted after the death of then former Haitian President Pierre Nord Alexis (1820–1910). (Note: Vol. 6; November 1911, No. 12 (1912), p. 1604, "Haytian Rag") President Alexis, after Dabney's tenure in Haiti, had declared himself President for life. He was then ousted from power December 2, 1908, followed by going into exile – first to Jamaica, then to New Orleans.

From Ziegfeld Follies of 1910

8. "That Minor Strain" (©1910), Gotham-Attucks Music Publishing Company, publisher (Note: Vol. 5; December 1910, Nos. 48–52 (1910), p. 1565, "That Minor Strain")
9. "Porto Rico," rag intermezzo (©1910), Maurice Shapiro, publisher (Note: Vol. 6; January 1911, No. 1 (1911), p. 75, "Porto Rico," piano rag) (Note: Vol. 33, No. 4; April 1938 (1938), p. 455; "Porto Rico")
10. "Oh! You Angel," rag (©1911), Maurice Shapiro, publisher (Note: Vol. 6; March 1911, No. 3 (1911), p. 342, "Oh You Angel," rag) (Note: Vol. 33, No. 4; April 1938 (1938), p. 454; "Oh You Angel Rag")
11. "Georgia Grind" (©1915), Jos. W. Stern & Co., publisher (Note: Vol. 10; April 1915, No. 4 (1915), p. 238, "Georgia Grind")

Castle compositions, co-composed with James Reese Europe, Joseph W. Stern (1870–1934), publisher

12. "The Castle Walk," trot and one-step (©1914) (Note: Vol. 10; April 1915, No. 4 (1914), p. 323, "The Castle Walk," et al.) (Note: Vol. 9; Part 1, April 1915, No. 7 (1914), p. 766, "Castle Combination," et al.)
13. "Castle Innovation Tango," Argentine tango (©1914)
14. "Castle Combination," waltz-trot (©1914)
15. "Congratulations Valse" (aka "Castle Lame Duck"), waltz (©1914)
16. "Castle Valse Classique," humoreske (©1914) – this was an adaptation by Dabney of Antonin Dvořák's Humoresque, Op. 101, No. 7 (of 8), Poco lento e grazioso in G♭ major
17. "Castle Perfect Trot," one trot, arranged by Carl F. Williams (Note: Carl F. Williams (né Carl Friedrich Christian Daniel Knust; 28 July 1867 Eldagsen, Hanover, Germany – 30 October 1944 Manhattan) was an American arranger.) (©1914) (image of the violin part)
18. "Castle Maxixe," Brazilian maxixe (©1914)
19. "Castles' Half and Half" (©1914), in quintuple meter – 5/4 (3 + 2)
20. "Enticement" (©1914), Argentine idyl, by Eporue Yenbad (surname ananyms used as pseudonyms for James Reese Europe and Ford Dabney), arranged by William H. Penn (né William Henry Penn; 1868–1929) (Note: Vol. 36, No. 7; July 1941 (1941), p. 1378; "Enticement")

The syndicated cartoon, Strange as It Seems, by Elsie Hix (née Elsie Teresa Huber; 1902–1995), dated September 21, 1959, states that "The fox trot was born because Ford Dabney, the band leader, played "Down Home Rag" too slow! The new step was improvised by Vernon and Irene Castle because the tempo was too slow their brisk one-step . . . "

From Kern and Bolton's Nobody Home (1915) (Note: The 1915 production, Nobody Home, at the Princess Theatre, was an American debut of a 1905 English musical, Mr. Popple of Ippleton.)

— Princess Theatre April 20, 2015, through June 1915; Maxine Elliott's Theatre June 7, 1915, through August 7, 1915

21. "At That San Francisco Fair," lyrics by Schuyler Greene (né Schuyler Rawson Greene; 1880–1929), music by Dabney, Europe, and Jerome Kern; published by T. B. Harms & Francis, Day & Hunter, Inc. (Note: Vol. 10; May 1915, No. 5 (1915), p. 315, "At That San Francisco Fair") (Note: Vol. 37, No. 5; May 1942 (1942), p. 876; "At That San Francisco Fair") performed in Act 2, sang by the character Miss Tony Miller with Chorus; Miller was played by Adele Rowland and Zoe Barnett

Songs (continued)

22. "The Last Waltz," music by Dabney, published by Jos. W. Stern & Co. (©1914)
23. "Boy of Mine" (©1915), words by Gene Buck, music by Dabney and James Reese Europe (Note: Vol. 10; August 1915, No. 8 (1915), p. 641, "Boy of Mine")
24. "Come Back and Bring My Heart" (©1917), words by Lester Aglar Walton (1882–1965) and Alex (aka Alec) Rogers (né Alexander Claude Rogers; 1876–1930), music by Dabney, arrangement by Alfred Ross (né Alfred Wigg Ross; 1892–1933) (Note: Vol. 12; Part 1, February 1917, No. 2 (1917), p. 88, "Come Back To Me and Bring My Heart") (Note: Vol. 39, No. 7; July-December 1944 (1944), p. 919; "Come Back and Bring My Heart")
25. "Just Live on Love" words by Lester Aglar Walton (1882–1965) and Alex Rogers, music by Dabney, arrangement by Alfred Ross (©1917) (Note: Vol. 12; Part 1, February 1917, No. 2 (1917), p. 105, "Just Live On Love") (Note: Vol. 39, No. 8; July-December 1944 (1944), p. 427; "Just Live on Love")
26. "Bugle Call Blues" (1922) (aka "Bugle Call Rag")
27. "You Can't Shake That Shimmie Here" (©1919), words by Alex Rogers, music by Dabney, Jerome H. Remick & Co., publisher (Note: Vol. 14; Part 1, April 1919, No. 4 (1919), p. 809, "You Can't Shake That Shimmie Here")
28. "Honey Dear" (©1934), from the 1934 film Social Register; music by Dabney and Con Conrad, lyrics by Edward Heyman; Harms, Inc., publisher (Note: Vol. 29; February 1934, No. 2 (1934), p. 140, "Honey Dear") (Note: Vol. 15, Part 5, No. 1; January-June 1961 (1961), p. 646; "Honey Dear")
29. "I'll Love You Next" (©1951), word by R.C. McPherson, music by Dabney, Shapiro, Bernstein & Co. (Note: Vol. 5, Part 5B, No. 2; July-December 1951 (1951), p. 321; "I'll Love You Next" (unpublished))

=== Scores ===
The King's Quest (©1909)

— Operetta: lyrics by J. Mord Allen (né Junius Mordecai Allen; 1875–1953), an African American poet, music by Dabney, which includes the song, "Oh! You Devil."

Rang Tang (©1927; renewed 1954)

— Musical revue: book by Kaj Gynt (1885–1956); lyrics by Joseph H. Trent; music by Dabney, who tailored some of it for Mae Barnes and Evelyn Preer; published by Leo Feist (Note: Vol. 22; July–December 1927, Nos. 7–12] (1927): 1. "Brown," © 1 c. 15 June 1927; E670045, p. 700; 2. "Come to Africa," © 1 c. 12 July 1927; E672192, p. 705; 3. "Ee Yah," hunting song, © 1 c. 15 June 1927; E670039, p. 712; 4. "Everybody Shout," © 1 c. 15 June 1927; E670034, p. 713; 5. "Feelin' Kinda Good," © 1 c. 12 July 1927; E672191, p. 714; 6. "Harlem," © 1 c. 15 June 1927; E670040, p. 722; 7. "Jubilee in Monkeyland," © 1 c. 15 June 1927; E670041, p. 738; 8. "Jungle Rose," fox trot; © 18 July 1927; 2 c. 20 July 1927; E672315, p. 738; 9. "Jungle Rose," © 1 c. 15 June 1927; E670036, p. 738; 10. "King and Queen," © 1 c. 12 July 1927; E782190, p. 740; 11. "Pay Me," © 1 c. 15 June 1927; E670035, p. 766; 12. "Rang Tang," fox trot; © 18 July 1927; 2 c. 20 July 1927; E672314, p. 771; 13. "Rang Tang," © 1 c. 15 June 1927; E670044, p. 771; 14. "Sammy and Topsy © 1 c. 15 June 1927; E670046, p. 775; 15. "Sammy's Banjo," © 1 c. 15 June 1927; E670037, p. 775; 16. "Six Little Wives," © 1 c. 27 June 1927; E670049, p. 780; 17. "Someday," © 1 c. 15 June 1927; E670038, p. 782; 18. "Sweet Evening Breeze," © 1 c. 12 July 1927; E672189, p. 787; 19. "Voodoo," © 1 c. 15 June 1927; E670043, p. 796; 20. "Zulu Fifth Avenue," © 1 c. 15 June 1927; E670042, p. 805; 21. "Brown," fox trot, © 6 Aug 1927; 2 c. 9 August 1927; E672870, p. 836; 22. "Brown," fox trot, Frank Edward Barry (1883–1937) orchestra arrangement (4to), © 6 August 1927; 2 c. 7 September 1927; E671250, p. 956; 23. "Rang Tang," fox trot, Frank Edward Barry (1883–1937) orchestra arrangement (4to), © 6 September 1927; 2 c. 7 September 1927; E671249, p. 1008; 24. Rang Tang, notice received, 18 October 1927; recorded Vol. 7, p. 150, p. 1170) (Note: Vol. 8, Part 5C, No. 1; January-June 1954 (1954), pp. 20, 26, 59, 63, 66, 70, 92; songs from Rang Tang) (Note: Vol. 8, Part 5C, No. 2; July-December 1954 (1954), pp. 100, 104, 109, 110, 111, 118, 129, 130, 147, 150, 153, 157, 158, 161, 169, 177; songs from Rang Tang)

30. "Rang Tang," fox trot
31. "Brown"
32. "Come to Africa"
33. "Ee Yah," hunting song
34. "Everybody Shout"
35. "Feelin' Kinda Good"
36. "Harlem"
37. "Jubilee in Monkeyland"
38. "Jungle Rose"
39. "King and Queen"
40. "Pay Me"
41. "Sammy and Topsy"
42. "Sammy's Banjo"
43. "Six Little Wives"
44. "Some Day"
45. "Sweet Evening Breeze"
46. "Voodoo"
47. "Zulu Fifth Avenue"

== Professional affiliations ==
- In April 1910, Dabney and several professional colleagues – including James Reese Europe, William Tyers (fr) (1870–1924), and Joe Jordan – formed the Clef Club, a union and booking agency that elevated the working conditions for black musicians in New York City.
- Around 1910, Dabney formed several touring vaudeville groups, among which, he and violinist Willie Carroll (né William Thomas Carroll; 1881–1943) conceived and produced Dabney's Ginger Girls, who first performed at his theater in Washington, D.C., before going on the road. The Ginger girls were a duet: Lottie Gee (née Charlotte O. Gee; 1886–1973), dancer and soprano, and Effie King, dancer and contralto (photo in New York Age, June 12, 1913, p. 6; accessible via Newspapers.com; subscription required)
- Dabney, Europe, and others left the Clef Club and, in 1913, organized the Tempo Club (an African American talent bureau), which became a rival to the Clef Club. It was the Tempo Club that furnished an orchestra for the dance team of Irene and Vernon Castle.
- Dabney became a member of ASCAP in 1937
- Dabney was a member of the Negro Actors Guild of America

== Selected audio, discography, rollography, filmography, and choreography ==
=== As composer ===
1. "Anoma"
  1. Elliott Adams and Tom Brier
    (audio via YouTube)
2. "Enticement," composed by G. Noceti (pseudonym of Ford Dabney)
  2. Prince's Band, Columbia A-5620, Matrix 37065, recorded 1914
3. "Castle Walk"
  3. Europe's Society Orchestra, Victor 17553-A, Matrix: B-14434, recorded February 10, 1914, New York
    Dabney is pianist
    (audio via YouTube)
  4. Black Manhattan, Vol. 2, The Paragon Ragtime Orchestra, Rick Benjamin, director, New World Records (2012): OCLC 820126531
    (audio via YouTube)
4. "Georgia Grind"
  5. Ragtime Entertainment, performed by Signor "Grinderino" (Note: Signor Grinderino was a pseudonym for Eddie King (né Edward T. King), a Victor executive and pianist for the company) (barrel piano), Victor 17884, Matrix B-16599, recorded March 12, 1915, Folkways RBF22
    (audio) courtesy Library of Congress
5. "Castle Perfect Trot"
  6. Black Manhattan (Vol. 1 of 3) (2002); OCLC 1131516363
    (audio via YouTube)
6. "Oh! You Devil"
  7. Black Manhattan, Vol. 2 (2012): OCLC 820126531
    (audio via YouTube)
  8. Willie "The Lion" Smith, Reminiscing The Piano Greats, Dial 305, recorded January 29, 1950, Paris
7. "Shine"
  9. Showarama Gypsy Jazz, Magnolia Entertainment NOLA
    (instrumental only; audio via YouTube)
  10. Dick Hyman, from the album There Will Never Be Another You, Jazz Connaisseur JCCD 9831-2, Live, Old Church (de), Boswil, Switzerland, October 25, 1998
    (audio via YouTube)
  11. Bing Crosby with the Mills Brothers, Brunswick 6276 & 6485, Matrix B11376A, recorded February 29, 1932, New York; OCLC 244487099
    (audio via YouTube)
    (audio via YouTube)
  12. Quintette du Hot Club de France: Stephane Grappelli (violin), Django Reinhardt (guitar), Joseph Reinhardt (guitar), Baro Ferret (guitar), Louis Vola (bass), Freddy Taylor, vocalist
    Grammophon (F)K-7790, Matrix OLA1293-1, recorded October 15, 1936, Paris
    (audio via YouTube)
8. "Bugle Call Blues"
  13. Ford Dabney's Syncopated Orchestra, Paramount 20125, Matrix 1018-3; recorded March 1922, New York; OCLC 82413982
    (audio via YouTube)

=== As band and orchestra leader ===
9. "I'm So Glad My Mamma Don't Know Where I'm At" (©1915), words and music by Willie Toosweet (né Willie Perry) (Note: Willie Too Sweet (né William Perry) was a vaudeville comedian, who, with his wife, Lulu Too Sweet, aka "Little Lulu" (née Susan Johnson; 1889–1923), managed the Gem Theater in Memphis from 1908 to 1910, after which, they began traveling southern vaudeville circuits as a duet comedy act, mixing confrontational humor with vernacular dancing and blues singing. In 1913, the song, "I'm So Glad My Mamma Don't Know Where I'm At," showcased Lula Too Sweet's bad-little-girl persona ("The Iroquois Theater" ‹of New Orleans›, by Lynn Abbot and Jack Stewart, The Jazz Archivist, Vol. 9 No. 2, December 1994; OCLC 748504163; ISSN 1085-8415). Willie Too Sweet became known as the "King of Colored Comedians" (sic). Beginning around 1939, he began starring with the Royal American Shows, which also featured Pine-Top's boogie-woogie piano.)
  14. Dabney's Band, Aeolian, released December 1918, New York; OCLC 1007628740
10. "Lassus Trombone" (©1915), one step (and trombone smear), by Henry Fillmore
  15. Dabney's Band with Ziegfeld's Midnight Frolic, Aeolian Vocalion B 12119, matrix 1486, recorded February 1919, New York
    (audio via YouTube)
11. "The Dancing Deacon" (©1919), by Frederick M. Bryan (1889–1929)
  16. Dabney's Band, Aeolian Vocalion B 12217, recorded September 1919, New York
    (audio via YouTube)
12. "Camp Meeting Blues," fox trot (©1920), by Willie Carroll (né William Thomas Carroll; 1881–1943)
  17. Dabney's Band, Aeolian Vocalion B12246, Matrix 2692, recorded November 1919, New York
13. "Sweet Man O' Mine" (©1921), words and music by Roy Turk and J. Russel Robinson
  18. Ford Dabney's Syncopated Orchestra, Paramount 20120, Matrix 1017-2, recorded March 1922, New York; OCLC 82413978, 83431860
    (audio via YouTube)
14. "Doo Dah Blues" (©1922), Fred Rose & Eddie White (pseudonym of Ted Fio Rito)
  19. Ford Dabney's Syncopated Orchestra, Paramount 20120, Matrix 1043-1, 2, recorded May 1922, New York; OCLC 81844518
    (audio via YouTube)

=== Rollography ===
15. "Shine"
  20. Played by Lee Sims (1898–1966), United States Piano Roll Company, Roll 42089
    (audio via YouTube)
  21. Played by Ferde Grofé (1892–1972) ("assisted"), Ampico 205001-E, "recording with words"
16. "Anoma"
  22. Played by Lee Sims (1898–1966), Ampico Lexington 88n, recut of early US 88-note 64714 B
    (audio via YouTube)
17. "Oh! You Devil"
  23. Connorized 4496 (65 note)
  24. Connorized 1514
  25. Full Scale 12334
  26. QRS 03179 (65 note)
  27. QRS 30726
  28. Universal 77837 (65 note)
  29. Universal 92465
  30. U.S. Music 62270
  31. Virtuoso 5931 (65 note)
18. "Oh You Angel"
  32. Full Scale 12334
  33. U.S. Music 74769

=== Filmography ===
"Shine"

- 1931: A Rhapsody in Black and Blue – performed by Louis Armstrong and band
- 1941: Birth of the Blues – sang by Bing Crosby
- 1942: Casablanca – sang by Dooley Wilson as Sam accompanied by the band in the setting at Rick's Cafe
- 1943: Cabin in the Sky – John William Sublett (aka John W. Bubbles) animates "Shine" in a song-and-dance number; Duke Ellington conducting the MGM studio orchestra and chorus, with Shorty Baker on trumpet and Buck Washington on piano (video via YouTube)
- 1955: The Benny Goodman Story – performed on trumpet by Harry James
- 1956: The Eddy Duchin Story – performed by Tyrone Power as Eddy Duchin and Rex Thompson as Peter Duchin with accompaniment
- 1989: Satchmo: The Live of Louis Armstrong
- 1997: Wild Man Blues – documentary
- 1999: Sweet and Lowdown

"Honey Dear"

- 1934: Social Register

"The Castle Walk"

1939: The Story of Vernon and Irene Castle

=== Dance ===
- 1983: Low Down and Dirty Rag, Donald Byrd/Group II, choreographed by Donald Byrd, premiered in New York November 3, 1983, at the Dance Theater Workshop, was a new production set to piano arrangements of popular music by Dabney in a suite of three duets based on such period "animal" dances – the Grizzly Bear, the Turkey Trot, and the Chicken Glide – choreographed, according to Jennifer Dunning of The New York Times:

" . . . from slow, sexy clinging to stylish high-stepping, with the performers adding to their outfits at the side of the stage between dances, in stage business that is as potent as the dancing itself. By the last dance, they have become period fashion plates in handsome costumes by Stephen dePietri (born 1952)."

== Chief collaborators ==
As bandleader, songwriter, professional organization founder

- James Reese Europe (1880–1919)

As songwriter

- Joe Trent (né Joseph Hannibal Trent; 1892–1954), American lyricist; re: 1927 Broadway production of Rang Tang
- Cecil Mack (1873–1944); re: Shine
- Lew Brown (1893–1958)
- Tim Brymn (1874–1946)

As theater orchestra musical director

- Florenz Ziegfeld (1867–1932): Dabney collaborated with Florenz Ziegfeld in the 1915 production of Midnight Frolic.

== Dabney's legacy as a ragtime pianist ==
In an effort to place Dabney as a ragtime pianist among peers, Elliott Shapiro (1895–1956), son of one of Dabney's publishers, Maurice Shapiro, in a 1951 article, offered a list of standout ragtime pianists – in two categories, (i) pioneers and (ii) later ragtimers. Shapiro included Dabney in the latter group.

== Family ==
Parents
Ford Thompson Dabney was born to John Wesley (J.W.) Dabney (1851–1924) (Note: "Deaths – Dabney," Evening Star, No. 29,418, November 15, 1924, p. 7 (accessible via Library of Congress, "Chronicling America")) and Rebecca C. Ford (maiden; 1854–1896). (Note: "District of Columbia Deaths, 1874–1961" (re: "Rebecca C. Dabney"), DOD: August 3, 1896, District of Columbia, citing reference ID 109217, District Records Center, Washington D.C.; FHL microfilm 2115023 (accessible via FamilySearch; free, but login registration required)) (Note: "Mrs. Dabney Dead" (mortuary notice), The Washington Bee, Vol. 15, No. 10, August 8, 1896, p. 5, col. 2 (bottom) Note: The notice wrongly states that Rebecca C. Dabney was the wife of Capt. James H. Dabney (she was the wife of Capt. John W. Dabney) (accessible via Library of Congress, "Chronicling America")) (Note: "Dabney" ("Rebecca Ford Dabney") (death notice), Evening Star (Washington, D.C.), Issue No. 13,549, August 5, 1896, p. 8, col. 7 (of 7) (accessible via Library of Congress, "Chronicling America")) J.W. and Rebecca had married November 13, 1879, in Alexandria, Virginia. (Note: "Virginia, Marriages, 1785–1940" via FamilySearch; re: Marriage of John W. Dabney and Rebecca C. Ford, November 13, 1879, Alexandria, Virginia; FHL Film No. 30497 (accessible via Ancestry.com; subscription required)) J.W. was a musician and celebrated barber, who, according to the Washington Times in 1903, had cut hair for President McKinley and President Theodore Roosevelt. (Note: "He Shaves Great Men" (includes illustration of J.W. Dabney), Colored American (Washington, D.C., Vol. 9, No. 13, June 29, 1901, pp. 1 & 4 (accessible via Library of Congress at p. 1 & p. 4)) Beginning around 1889, J.W. Dabney was often referred to as Capt. J.W. Dabney, reflecting his rank in a Washington, D.C.–based milita, exclusively African-American, known as the Washington Cadet Corps, founded June 12, 1880 – which in 1887, was the first unit to become a permanent part of the then newly established District of Columbia National Guard, Fifth Battalion. Capt. Dabney, nonetheless, as a professional, was chronicled as an innovative and successful tonsorial artist. Ford's step-mother, Capt. Dabney's second wife (married December 21, 1898) – Gertrude V. Dabney (née Gertrude V. Adams; 1876–1961) – sold J.W. Dabney's tonic products.

J.W. Dabney's barber shop, in the latter 1880s, was at the Hamilton House Hotel, 14th and K Streets, N.W. (same site as the Hamilton Hotel erected in 1922 at the northwest corner of Franklin Square). On November 15, 1888, J.W. Dabney opened a barber shop at Welckers Hotel (see photo below), 721 15th Street, N.W., between New York Avenue and H Street, N.W.

Dabney's stepmother, Gertrude, in 1929, held the distinction of serving on the first all-women jury in Washington, D.C. She was the only non-white. (Note: "First All-Women Jury in the District," Evening Star, No. 31,242, November 13, 1929, p. 17 ("Society" section) (accessible via Library of Congress, "Chronicling America"))

Wife
Dabney married – on March 14, 1912, in Washington – Martha D. Gans, widow of boxer Joe Gans who had owned the Goldfield Hotel in Baltimore at the corner of East Lexington and Colvin Streets, just east of downtown, in the Pleasant View Gardens neighborhood. Joe Gans – according to boxing historian and Ring Magazine founder Nat Fleischer – was the greatest lightweight boxer of all-time.

Ford and Martha had a son, Ford Thompson Dabney, Jr. (1917–1983), who became a certified public accountant.

Uncle and step-aunt: James H. and Ruby H. Dabney
Gertrude's sister (Ford Dabney's step-aunt), Ruby H. Dabney (née Ruby Adams; 1872–1901) (see photo below), was the second of three wives of one of Ford's uncles, James H. Dabney (1846–1923), a prominent and affluent Washington, D.C.–based undertaker and philanthropist. Ruby, in 1898, earned a professional degree from the Massachusetts College of Embalming, Boston (Note: At the end of 1893, the Dodge brothers, chemists of Boston, acquired the Oriental School of Embalming in Boston. Asa Johnson Dodge (1849–1926) ran it simultaneously with the newly formed Dodge Chemical Company (embalming chemicals). In 1894, the name was changed to "Massachusetts College of Embalming." In 1989, it became a constituent institute of Mount Ida College, which closed in 2018.) – notable for being the first African American woman in the history of Washington, D.C., to earn a college diploma. (Note: "Female Embalmer – First in History of Washington. Madam Ruby H. Dabney Get Diploma," The Washington Bee, October 29, 1898, p. 4 (accessible via Library of Congress, "Chronicling America"))

Uncle: Wendell Phillips Dabney
Dabney's uncle, Wendell Phillips Dabney (1965–1952), who is chronicled as having been one of his music teachers, became founding president of Cincinnati chapter of the NAACP, author, and newspaper editor and publisher of the Ohio Enterprise, later named The Union, both late of Cincinnati. During the early 1890s, Prof. Wendell Phillips Dabney was of the most notable musicians in Richmond, Virginia. He had studied attended music in 1883 at the Oberlin Conservatory of Music. Part of his influence on Ford Dabney, as his student, may be found in the 1914 composition, "Castle Valse Classique," humoreske, an adaptation by Dabney of Antonin Dvořák's Humoresque, Op. 101, No. 7 (of 8), Poco lento e grazioso in G♭ major. Prof. Dabney, in 1895, contacted Dvořák, who was director the National Conservatory of Music of America, an institution in New York that, like Oberlin, accepted African Americans. At Dvořák's home, Prof. Dabney, among other things, introduced one of his own compositions, a plantation melody, "Uncle Remus." (Note: "W. Philips Dabney, the Accomplished Guitar Soloist in Ohio – Making a Splendid Record – Richmond Proud of Him, Richmond Planet, Vol. 12, No. 10, February 23, 1895, p. 3, col. 1 (of 8) (accessible via Library of Congress, "Chronicling America"))

Great uncle: John Marshall Dabney
One of Dabney's great uncles, John Marshall Dabney (1824–1900), was honored in November 2015 in Richmond, Virginia, at the Quirk Hotel, as a caterer and bartender – known as the world's greatest mint julep maker. The event was attended by notable community members and one of his great-great granddaughters, Jennifer Hardy (née Jennifer Dehaven Jackson). Jennifer's mother (great-granddaughter-in-law of John Marshall Dabney), Mary Hinkson (1925–2014), was an internationally celebrated modern dancer. His legacy was the subject of the a 23-minute documentary released in 2017, The Hail-Storm: John Dabney in Virginia, by Hannah Ayers and Lance Warren.

One of John Marshall Dabney's sons (Dabney's 1st cousin, once removed)
John Milton Dabney (né Milton Williamson Dabney; 1867–1967) was a player in the Black baseball leagues. Alexander "Buck" Spottswood, as manager, and J. Milton Dabney as team captain, reorganized, in 1895, the Manhattan Baseball Club of Richmond, Virginia. J.M. Dabney also played for the Original Cuban Giants of St. Augustine, Florida, and Trenton, New Jersey – the first professional African-American baseball team.

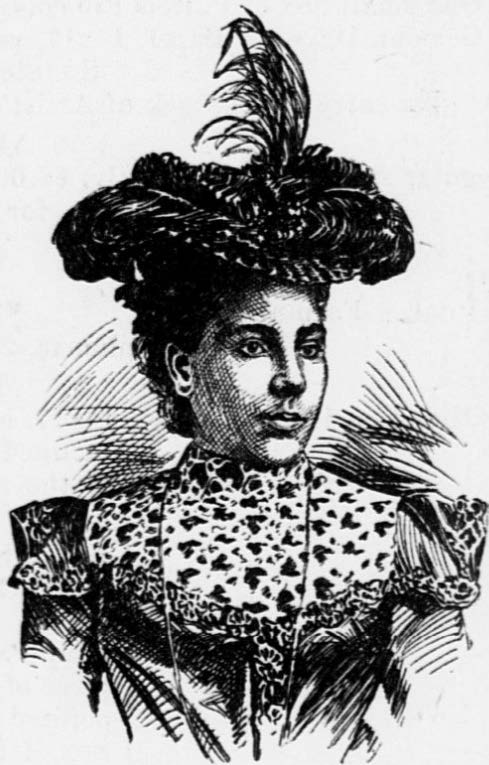
1898
Ruby H. Dabney

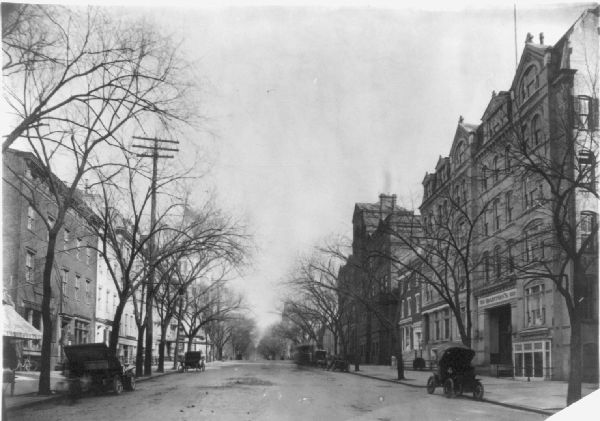
March 1906
Location of J.W. Dabney's barber shop
at Welcker's Hotel – second building on the right, looking north from New York Avenue
721, 15th St, N.W.

== Notes, copyrights, and references ==
=== Copyrights ===
Catalog of Copyright Entries, Part 3 – Musical Compositions, New Series (beginning 1905, ending 1945) & Third Series (beginning 1946), Library of Congress, Copyright Office
Original copyrights

Note: sheet music copyrighted in the U.S. (a) prior to 1925 with copyright renewal or (b) from 1925 through 1963 without copyright renewal is deemed public domain.

Copyright renewals

=== Encyclopedic / biographical ===
1. "Ford Dabney," by Eugene Chadbourne, AllMusic (retrieved April 20, 2015)
2. "Ford Dabney Discography" at Discogs (retrieved April 20, 2015)
3. Biographical Dictionary of American Music, by Charles Eugene Claghorn (1911–2005), West Nyack: Parker Publishing Company, Inc. (1973), p. 113; OCLC 499284774; ISBN 978-0-1307-6331-0
4. The Oxford Companion to Popular Music, by Peter Gammond (1925–2019), Oxford Companions, Oxford University Press (1991; 1993 reprint with corrections); OCLC 264970416
5. Biography Index, A cumulative index to biographical material in books and magazines, Vol. 14, September 1984 – August 1986, H.W. Wilson Co. (1986); OCLC 36821512, 956660721 (online via Gale)
6. Profiles of African American Stage Performers and Theatre People, 1816–1960, by Bernard L. Peterson, Jr., Greenwood Press (2001); OCLC 1126462332
7. In Black and White, A guide to magazine articles, newspaper articles, and books concerning black individuals and groups (3rd ed.), Mary Mace Spradling (née Mary Elizabeth Mace; 1911–2009) (ed.)
  (Vol. 1 of 2), Gale Research (1980); OCLC 631458944
  (3rd ed.; supplement), Gale Research (1985); OCLC 849767637
