= Castle Walk =

American dance and song written for Vernon and Irene Castle

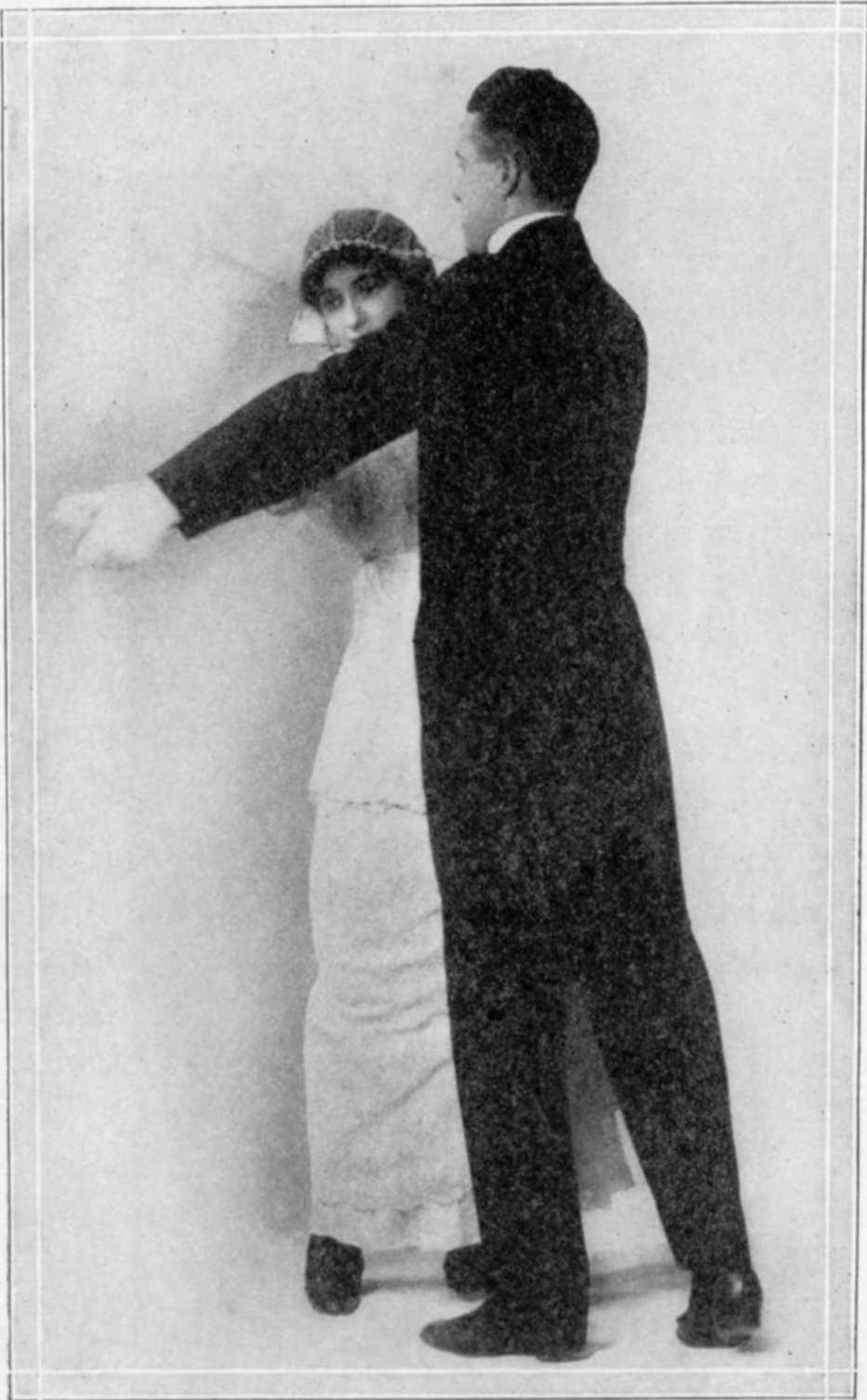
A couple demonstrating a Castle Walk dance step. From Walker, C. (1914) The Modern Dances - How to Dance Them.

Castle Walk is a dance originated and made famous by Vernon and Irene Castle. The moniker was coined from the Castle's signature dance step styling, and their touring stage show of 1913 led with this as their signature. The Castle Walk became popular through its introduction into the Tango. "Castle Walk" is also a popular American song composed for Vernon and Irene Castle by James Reese Europe (1880–1919) and Ford Thompson Dabney (1883–1958). It was first recorded in 1914, commissioned by the Castles to accompany and provide music for their social dancing programs, having been one of these resulting pieces. Though many dance accompaniments of the time are syncopated rhythms, Castle Walk in particular carries syncopation in half-measure.

== The dance ==
In this dance, the man (the leader) continually goes forward and the lady (the follower) backward. In order that the lady may be properly guided about the room, the man's arm encircles her right under her arm, while her left hand rests on the man's right arm. The position of the lady's right arm and the man's left arm is high, with their hands clasped, as portrayed in the illustration.

The man starts forward with his left foot and the lady backward with her right, walking with gliding steps, keeping on the toes to one count of the music with each step. This is continued to the end of the room, where a large circle is begun, which is gradually made smaller and smaller, until it is ended by whirling completely around three times to corresponding counts of the music, ending with a dip. The three whirls must be done rapidly to accomplish a complete revolution to one beat of the music.

The Castle Walk may be varied by describing the figure eight or zig-zag instead of the large circle in the steps taken.

Troy Kinney describes the Castle Walk as part of One-Step as follows:

This is a walking step of direct advance and retreat, not used to move to the side. The couple are in closed position, the woman, therefore, stepping backward as the man steps forward, and vice versa. The advancing foot is planted in fourth position, the knee straight, the toe down so that the ball of the foot strikes the floor first. The walk presents an appearance of strutting, although the shoulders are held level, and the body firm; a sharp twist that punctuates each step is effected by means of pivoting on the supporting foot. The shoulder and hip movements that originally characterized the "trot" are no longer practiced in the dance.

== The song ==
- "The Castle Walk," trot and one-step, Jos. W. Stern & Co., publisher (Joseph W. Stern; 1870–1934) (©1914); OCLC 10728633

== Early discography ==
- "Castle Walk," Europe's Society Orchestra, Victor, Matrix: B-14434, recorded February 10, 1914, New York

Musicians:

1. Emporia-born Crickett Smith (1881–1947), cornet
2. Detroit-born Edgar Campbell (né Edgar O. Campbell; born 1889), clarinet
3. Tracy Cooper, violin
4. George Smith, violin
5. Walter Scott, violin
6. Leonard Smith, piano
7. Washington, D.C.-born Ford Thompson Dabney (1883–1958)
8. Buddy Gilmore, drums
9. Jim Europe, leader, arranger
10. Five unidentified banjoists and mandolinists
- "Castle Walk," Prince's Band, Columbia, Matrix: 36930, catalog no. A5562, recorded April 15, 1914, New York
