= James Reese Europe =

American jazz musician and US Army officer (1880–1919)

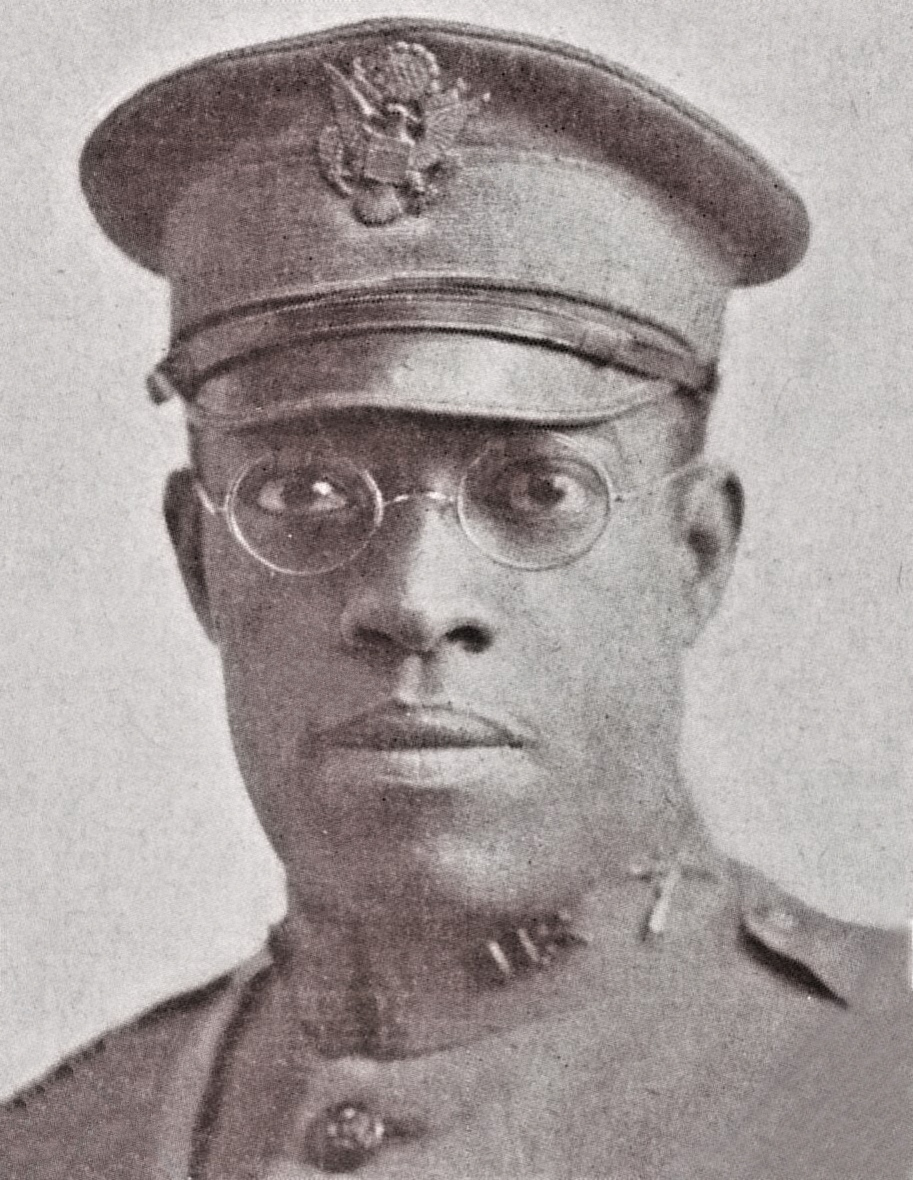
- Europe in 1919

Background information
- Also known as: Lieut. Jim Europe
- Born: February 22, 1880; Mobile, Alabama, US
- Died: May 9, 1919 (aged 39) Boston, Massachusetts, US
- Genres: Ragtime; jazz; military band
- Occupations: Bandleader; arranger; composer
- Instruments: Violin, piano
- Formerly of: Clef Club Orchestra; 369th Regiment Marching Band

James Reese Europe (February 22, 1880 – May 9, 1919) was an American ragtime and early jazz bandleader, arranger, and composer. A leading figure in New York City's African-American music scene during the 1910s, he was among the first African-American musicians to achieve mainstream recognition. Eubie Blake called him the "Martin Luther King of music".

== Early life ==
Europe was born in Mobile, Alabama, to Henry Jefferson Europe (1848–1899) and Loraine Saxon (1849–1930). When he was 10 years old, his family – including four siblings, Minnie Europe (Mrs. George Mayfield; 1868–1931), Ida S. Europe (1870–1919), John Newton Europe (1875–1932), and Mary Loraine (1883–1947) – relocated to Washington, D.C. In 1904, Europe moved to New York. He had a son, James Reese Europe, Jr. (1917–2001) with Bessie Simms (1888–1931).

== Bandleader ==
In 1910, Europe organized the Clef Club, a society for Black Americans in the music industry. In 1912, the club made history when it played a concert at Carnegie Hall for the benefit of the Colored Music Settlement School. The Clef Club Orchestra, while not a jazz band, became the first band to play proto-jazz at Carnegie Hall – 12 years before the Paul Whiteman and George Gershwin concert at Aeolian Hall, and 26 years before Benny Goodman's famed concert at Carnegie Hall. The Clef Club's performances played music written solely by Black composers, including Harry T. Burleigh and Samuel Coleridge-Taylor.

Europe's orchestra included Will Marion Cook, who had not been in Carnegie Hall since his own performance as solo violinist in 1896. Cook was the first black composer to launch full musical productions, fully scored with a cast and story every bit as classical as any Victor Herbert operetta. In the words of Gunther Schuller, Europe "...stormed the bastion of the white establishment and made many members of New York's cultural elite aware of Negro music for the first time". The New York Times remarked, "These composers are beginning to form an art of their own"; yet by their third performance, a review in Musical America said Europe's Clef Club should "give its attention during the coming year to a movement or two of a Haydn Symphony".

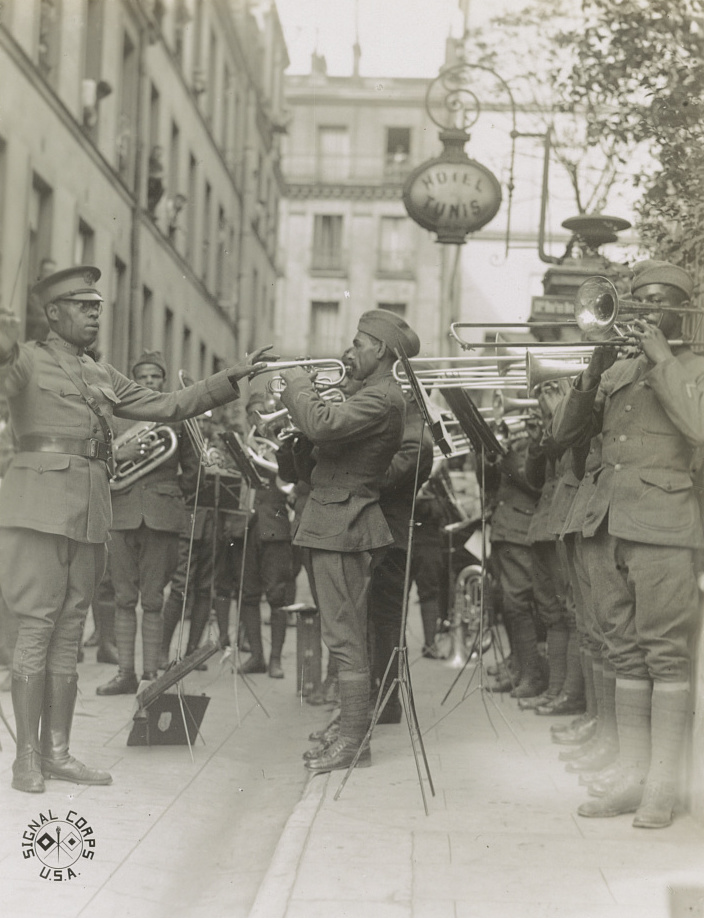
Europe (far left) conducting the 369th's military band in a Paris hospital

In 1913 and 1914, he made a series of phonograph records for the Victor Talking Machine Company. These recordings are among the best examples of the pre-jazz hot ragtime style of the U.S. Northeast of the 1910s. Although the Original Dixieland Jass Band (ODJB), a group of white musicians, claimed to have made the first "jass" or jazz recordings for Victor in 1917, earlier recordings by Reese and other Black American musicians preceded and inspired the ODJB, even if they were not called nor marketed as "jazz" at the time.

Neither the Clef Club Orchestra nor the Society Orchestra were small "Dixieland" style bands. They were large symphonic bands to satisfy the tastes of a public that was used to performances by the likes of the John Philip Sousa band and similar organizations very popular at the time. The Clef Orchestra had 125 members; they played on various occasions between 1912 and 1915 in Carnegie Hall. It is instructive to read a comment from a music review in The New York Times from March 12, 1914: "... the program consisted largely of plantation melodies and spirituals [arranged such as to show that] these composers are beginning to develop an art of their own based on their folk material ..."

Europe was known for his outspoken personality and unwillingness to bend to musical conventions, particularly in his insistence on playing his own style of music. He responded to criticism by saying, "We have developed a kind of symphony music that, no matter what else you think, is different and distinctive, and that lends itself to the playing of the peculiar compositions of our race ... My success had come ... from a realization of the advantages of sticking to the music of my own people." And later, "We colored people have our own music that is part of us. It's the product of our souls; it's been created by the sufferings and miseries of our race."

== Military service ==
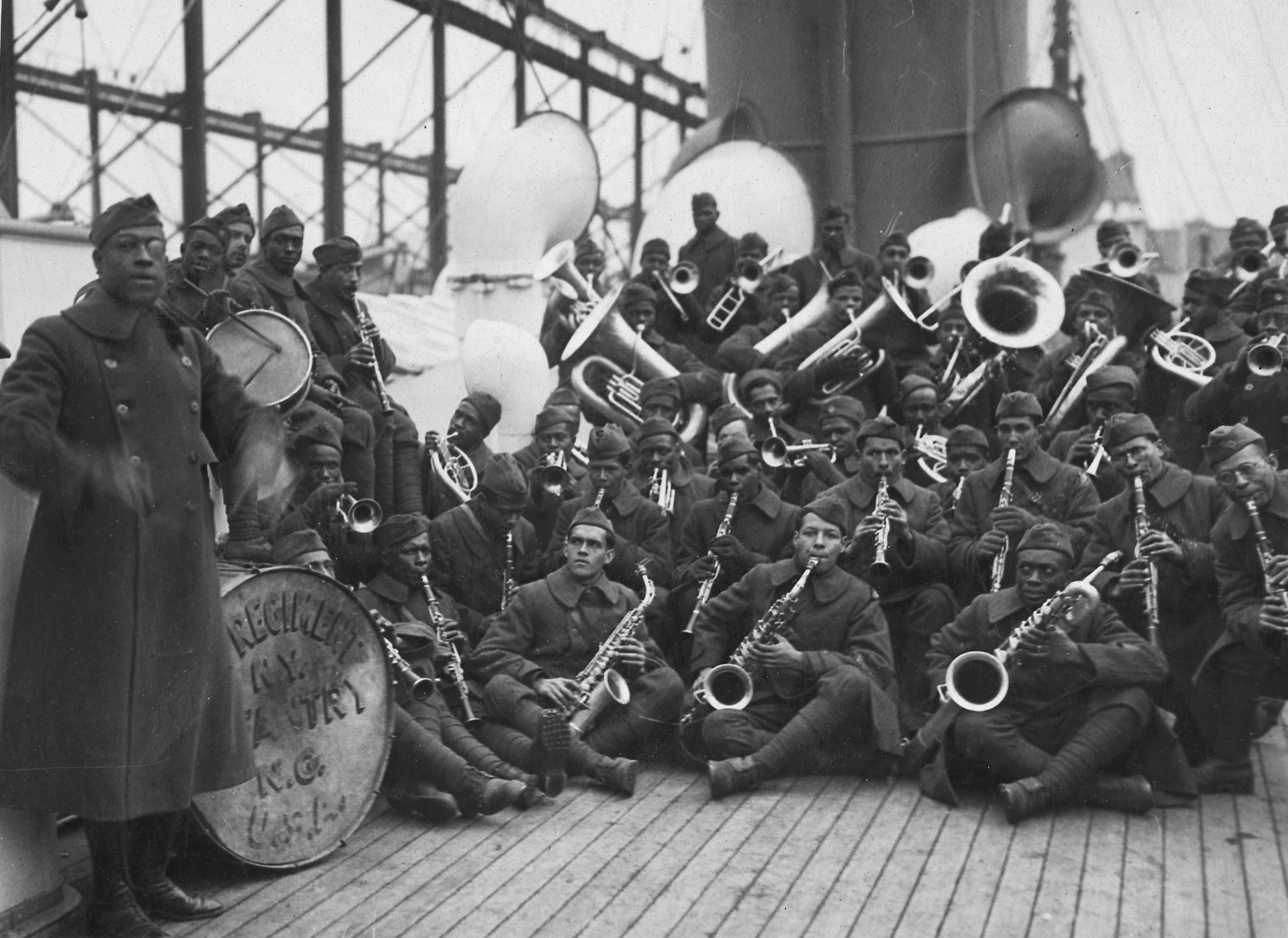
Europe (far left) returning to New York onboard the SS Stockholm

During World War I, Europe obtained a commission as a second lieutenant in the New York Army National Guard, later reorganized as the 369th Infantry Regiment (the "Harlem Hellfighters"). He was given command of the regiment's machine gun company and also tasked with directing the regimental band, which would later achieve great acclaim. When the regiment shipped out, it did so quietly, without the farewell parade given to other New York units.

Upon arriving in France, the 369th Infantry was assigned to the French Army, as the American Expeditionary Forces refused to field African American soldiers in combat. The unit saw 191 days of combat, more than any other American regiment during the war. The first Croix de Guerre (Cross of War) medals awarded to Americans were given to members of the 369th. Europe was responsible for training his men in the use of Chauchat machine guns and hand grenades.

Europe became the first African American officer to lead troops into battle during World War I. After suffering from a gas attack, he was incapacitated but later recovered. By February and March 1918, Europe had recuperated enough to lead his regimental band on a tour of France, performing for British, French, and American audiences as well as French civilians. The band traveled over 2,000 miles and introduced jazz to European audiences, boosting morale. Europe's "Hellfighters" also made their first recordings in France for the Pathé brothers. The first concert included a French march, and the "Stars and Stripes Forever", as well as syncopated numbers such as "The Memphis Blues", which, according to a later description of the concert by band member Noble Sissle "... started ragtimitis in France". The "Hellfighters" were the first New York unit to return home.

== Post-war career ==
All Of No Man's Land Is Ours
"All Of No Man's Land Is Ours", written by Europe and Noble Sissle; recorded in 1919 with vocals by Sissle.

After his return home in February 1919, he stated: "I have come from France more firmly convinced than ever that Negros should write Negro music. We have our own racial feeling and if we try to copy whites we will make bad copies ... We won France by playing music which was ours and not a pale imitation of others, and if we are to develop in America we must develop along our own lines."

In 1919, Europe made more recordings for Pathé Records. These include both instrumentals and accompaniments with vocalist Noble Sissle who, with Eubie Blake, would later have great success with their 1921 production of Shuffle Along, which gives us the classic song "I'm Just Wild About Harry". Differing in style from Europe's recordings of a few years earlier, they incorporate blues, blue notes, and early jazz influences.

== Death ==
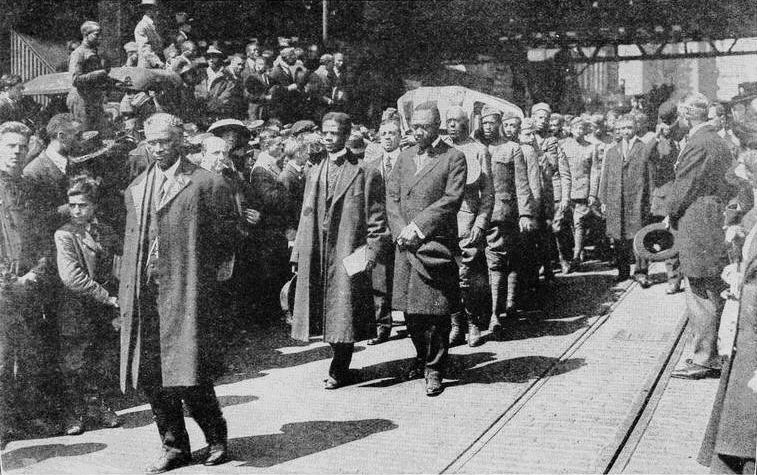
Europe's funeral procession

On the night of May 9, 1919, Europe performed for the last time. He had been feeling ill all day, but wanted to go on with the concert (which was to be the first of three in Boston's Mechanics Hall). During the intermission Europe went to have a talk with two of his drummers, Steve and Herbert Wright. After Europe criticized some of their behavior (walking off stage during others' performances), Wright became very agitated and threw his drumsticks down in a seemingly unwarranted outburst of anger.

Wright claimed Europe did not treat him well and that he was tired of getting blamed for others' mistakes. He lunged for Europe with a penknife and was able to stab him in the neck. Europe told his band to finish the set and he would see them the next morning. To Europe and his band the wound seemed superficial. As he was carried away, he told them "I'll get along alright." At the hospital, they could not stop the bleeding and he died hours later. Herbert Wright was convicted of manslaughter, and sentenced to fifteen years, but was released early after eight years on good behavior.

News of Europe's death spread fast. Composer and bandleader W. C. Handy wrote: "The man who had just come through the baptism of war's fire and steel without a mark had been stabbed by one of his own musicians ... The sun was in the sky. The new day promised peace. But all the suns had gone down for Jim Europe, and Harlem didn't seem the same." Europe was granted the first ever public funeral for a black American in the city of New York. Tanney Johnson said of his death: "Before Jim Europe came to New York, the colored man knew nothing but Negro dances and porter's work. All that has been changed. Jim Europe was the living open sesame to the colored porters of this city. He took them from their porters' places and raised them to positions of importance as real musicians. I think the suffering public ought to know that in Jim Europe, the race has lost a leader, a benefactor, and a true friend."

At the time of Europe's death, he was the best-known black American bandleader in the United States. He was buried at Arlington National Cemetery, in Arlington, Virginia.

Europe was mentioned in F. Scott Fitzgerald's short story "No Flowers".

== Compositions ==
Some of Europe's best-known compositions include several that were co-composed with Ford Dabney (1883–1958) for the famed dancers Irene and Vernon Castle. The Castles regarded Europe's Society Orchestra among the best they had worked with and hired Europe late in 1913 as their preferred bandleader with Dabney as their arranger.

Co-compositions

- Co-composed with Dabney for the Castles; Joseph W. Stern (1870–1934), publisher
  - Castle Walk one-step (1914)
  - Argentine tango
  - Castle Combination, waltz-trot
  - Congratulations Valse (also known as Castle Lame Duck), waltz
  - Castle Valse Classique humoreske – this was an adaptation by Dabney of Antonin Dvořák's Humoresque, Op. 101, No. 7 (of 8), Poco lento e grazioso in G♭ major
  - Castle Perfect Trot one trot, arranged by Carl F. Williams (image of the violin part)
  - Castle Maxixe Brazilian maxixe
  - Castles Half and Half – in quintuple meter – 5/4 (3 + 2)
  - Enticement – Argentine idyl (a non-Castle tango), by Eporue Yenbad (surname ananyms used as pseudonyms for Europe and Dabney), arranged by William H. Penn (né William Henry Penn; 1868–1929)
  - At That San Francisco Fair lyrics by Schuyler Greene (né Schuyler Rawson Greene; 1880–1929), music by Dabney, Europe, and Kern; published by T. B. Harms & Francis, Day & Hunter, Inc. performed in Act 2, sung by the character Miss Tony Miller with chorus; Miller was played by Adele Rowland and Zoe Barnett.
- Co-composed with Dabney for Jerome Kern and Bolton's Nobody Home (1915)
  - The 1915 production Nobody Home, at the Princess Theatre, was an American debut of a 1905 English musical, Mr. Popple of Ippleton. Princess Theatre April 20, 1915, through June 1915; Maxine Elliott's Theatre June 7, 1915, through August 7, 1915.
- Co-composed with Dabney, lyrics by Gene Buck, for Ziegfeld's Midnight Frolic, sung by Nora Bayes; Francis, Day & Hunter Ltd., publisher Boy of Mine.

Composed solely by Europe

- Composed solely by Europe for the Castles; G. Ricordi & Co., publisher
  - Castle Doggy foxtrot

== See also ==
- The Frogs (club)
- African American musical theater
