= Louis Mitchell =

American jazz drummer (1885–1957)

Louis A. Mitchell (December 17, 1885 – September 12, 1957) was an American jazz drummer and bandleader.

Mitchell began performing in vaudeville revues and minstrel shows from around the turn of the century, playing drums and bandoline. After moving to New York City in 1912, he founded his own group, the Southern Symphonists' Quartet. Mitchell sang and drummed for James Reese Europe in 1918, and the following year founded a new group, which he called Louis Mitchell's Jazz Kings. Toward the end of the decade, Mitchell began touring Europe as well as the United States, concentrating on the United Kingdom and France. He did solo percussion shows in addition to ensemble programs, and his drum solos were greeted harshly by French audiences. Nevertheless, his ensemble spent five years as the house band of the Casino de Paris.

He recorded for Pathe Records in 1922 and 1923; Sidney Bechet played with him at this time, though Bechet did not appear on the recordings. Mitchell remained in France until 1930, branching into restaurant and nightclub management in addition to music. He renamed one of his clubs "Chez Florence" due to the popularity of performer Florence Embry Jones. He moved back to the United States in 1930 after the failure of his last club, the Plantation, but played little in his last decades.
