= Social Register (film) =

1934 film by Marshall Neilan

- Theatrical release poster
- Directed by: Marshall Neilan
- Written by: James Creelman (dialogue); Clara Beranger (adaptation); Grace Perkins (additional dialogue)
- Screenplay by: James Ashmore Creelman (as James Creelman)
- Based on: the play by Anita Loos and John Emerson
- Starring: Colleen Moore
- Cinematography: Merritt B. Gerstad (as Merritt Gerstad)
- Edited by: Robert R. Snody (as Robert Snody)
- Music by: Con Conrad
- Color process: Black and white
- Production companies: Associated Film Productions; Columbia Pictures
- Distributed by: Columbia Pictures
- Release date: March 10, 1934
- Running time: 71 minutes
- Country: United States
- Language: English

Social Register is an American 1934 pre-Code comedy-drama musical film starring Colleen Moore. The film re-united her with her old friend and one of the first directors to give her film career a start, Marshall Neilan. The film was based on the 1931 play of the same name by Anita Loos and John Emerson.

== Plot ==
Patsy Shaw upsets a stuffy party at the home of wealthy Mr. Henry Breene by stealing a necktie to win the scavenger hunt at Robert Benchley's party across the street. Charlie Breene, Henry's spoiled son, comes to retrieve his tie and becomes infatuated with Patsy.

Three months later, Charlie gives Patsy a valuable diamond bracelet, which she reluctantly accepts. Back at her apartment, Lester Trout, a saxophone player, convinces Patsy that he is ill and has lost his job. Patsy gives Lester the bracelet as a loan, against the advice of her friends, who are suspicious of him.

Charlie's mother, Mrs. Henry Horace "Maggie" Breene, fearful of her son's relationship with a plebeian, arranges a party hoping Patsy's lack of social graces will ruin Charlie's affection for her. Finding the party boring, Patsy goes to the bar, where after a few drinks, she begins to entertain the guests who are slowly wandering in to escape the dull affair. Maggie, relying on the family patriarch, Uncle Jefferson Breene, to end the romance, announces his arrival, but she is aghast when Patsy fondly hugs the old man whom she knows as "Jonesie", the friend of one of her roommates. Maggie then asks family attorney Albert Wiggins to end the romance, no matter the cost. Wiggins pays Lester to tell Patsy that he is ill and in need of her help. Charlie is informed about what Patsy did with the bracelet and accuses her of being unfaithful. Lester convinces Patsy to marry him, but as soon as they wed, she finds Wiggins' check for $5000 and realizes the truth. Patsy tears the check up, just as Charlie arrives with Jonesie, who arranges their reconciliation. Having only been married to Lester for ten minutes, Charlie has Wiggins arrange Patsy's annulment.

== Cast ==
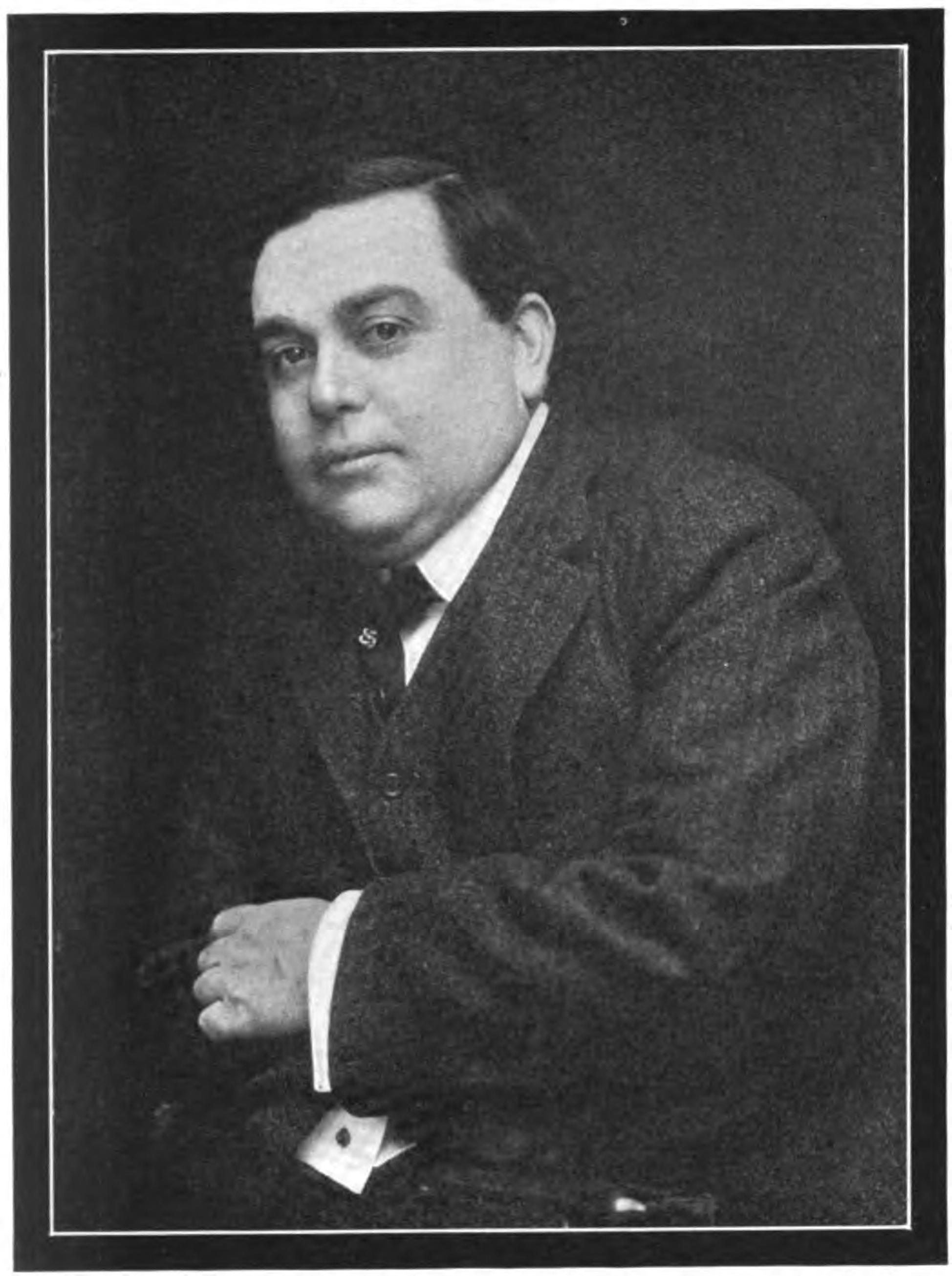
Edward Garvie

- Colleen Moore - Patsy Shaw
- Charles Winninger - "Jonesie," also known as Uncle Jefferson Breene
- Pauline Frederick - Mrs. Henry Horace "Maggie" Breene
- Alexander Kirkland - Charlie Breene
- Robert Benchley - Himself
- Ross Alexander - Lester Trout
- Margaret Livingston - Gloria
- Olive Olsen - Ruth
- John Miltern - Mr. Henry Breene
- Edward Garvie - Albert Wiggins
- Frey & Bragiotti - Piano duo
- Georgette Harvey - Lulu

== Songs ==
- "Honey Dear" (music by Ford Dabney and Con Conrad, lyrics by Edward Heyman)
- "I Didn't Want to Love You" (music by Conrad, lyrics by Ned Washington)
- "Why Not" (music by Conrad, lyrics by Heyman)

== Background ==
After several years of semi-retirement from Hollywood, Moore returned to the film industry. The character she played in this film, while still working class (as they were in her other films for Neilan, like Dinty and Her Wild Oat) was more sophisticated and adult than the women she had played at the height of her fame in the late 1920s. Neilan was a heavy drinker and over the years his reputation as a director was eroded by his drinking and his disdain for authority. This was one of his last major films. Some scenes were filmed on location in New York City. A print of this film has long been held by the Library of Congress.

== Notes ==
- Synopsis, nytimes.com; accessed 24 March 2016.
- Colleen Moore, Silent Star, Doubleday, 1968.
- Jeff Codori (2012), Colleen Moore; A Biography of the Silent Film Star, McFarland Publishing,(Print ISBN 978-0-7864-4969-9, EBook ISBN 978-0-7864-8899-5).
