= Mary Europe =

American organist and pianist

Mary Loraine Europe
- Born: October 1885; Mobile, Alabama
- Died: 1947 (aged 61–62); Washington, D.C.
- Occupation(s): Pianist and music educator
- Parent(s): Henry J. Europe and Loraine (Saxon) Europe

Mary Loraine Europe was an American pianist, organist, and music educator who rose to prominence musically during the early 1900s as a performer with the Samuel Coleridge-Taylor Choral Society. She was African-American and was the younger sister of ragtime composer and World War I-era bandleader James Reese Europe (1880—1919).

== Formative years ==
Born in Mobile, Alabama in October 1885, Mary Loraine Europe was the daughter of Henry J. Europe (1847-1899) and Loraine (Saxon) Europe. Her father was a native of Alabama and a devoted member of the Baptist Church of Mobile. Her mother was a talented musician who instilled a love of music in all of the Europe children.

During the late 1880s, she resided in Mobile with her parents and siblings: Ida S., Minnie, John Newton, and James Reese Europe.

Before the decade was out, she and her family had relocated from Mobile to Washington, D.C.. Their first home, at 308 B Street, SE, was situated close to the U.S. Post Office, where her father worked as a clerk in 1889. By 1891, he was employed as a supervisor in the Mail Equipment Division and had enrolled as a student at the Howard University School of Law.

Meanwhile, Mary Europe and her siblings continued to pursue their studies through piano lessons from their mother and via the city's public schools. Older brothers, John (aged 15) and James (aged 9), respectively attended Washington’s Preparatory High School (later known as “M Street High”) and Lincoln Grammar School. Jim was also studying violin at this time with Joseph Douglass, the grandson of Civil War abolitionist Frederick Douglass.

After their father resigned his position with the U.S. Postal Service in 1894 in order to pursue a career as a realtor, Mary Europe relocated with her parents and siblings to 1705 8th Street, NW in Washington, D.C., where they remained until 1898. Still living at home were her older siblings, Ida, a 24-year-old secretary with the U.S. Government Printing Office, and John, a 19-year-old music teacher, as was her older brother, Jim, an M Street High School student. Religiously, she and her family were members of the Lincoln Memorial Congregational Church.

It was during this time that her parents reportedly paid for music theory lessons for Mary with the Leipzig Conservatory-trained Hans Hanke. In addition, after performing a duet with her brother, Jim, at the Vermont Avenue Baptist Church in July 1894, she subsequently beat out her brother for first prize in a community competition for musical composers that same year.

Her relatively ordered world was upended by the death of her father on June 21, 1899, who was buried two days later at the Columbian Harmony Cemetery, one of the largest African-American cemeteries in the city until it was closed to enable construction of the Rhode Island Avenue-Brentwood Metro Station. (When the remains of the 37,000 men, women and children who had been interred there were exhumed in 1960 for reinterment at the National Harmony Memorial Park Cemetery in nearby Landover, Maryland, a number of gravestones were discarded, resulting in the reburial of many in unmarked graves.)

The unexpected death of Mary Europe's father caused financial hardships for the family, but these troubles gradually eased when her oldest siblings secured better-paying jobs. As the new century dawned, the majority of the Europe siblings then began to achieve a measure of fame as their musical talents were recognized and rewarded. According to Reid Badger, biographer of James Europe:

John, James, and Mary Europe all eventually made their living in music. John and Mary achieved notable reputations as pianists—John as a performer and occasional instructor of ragtime and popular music in New York; Mary as a teacher and accompanist of religious and concert music in Washington. James, whose contributions would be the most important, seems to have been the most broadly musical of the three. Although only nine years old when the Europes left Mobile, he had already begun to demonstrate his abilities, both on the piano (under his mother’s instruction), as well as in improvising on the fiddles and banjos (encouraged by his father), which were more common to the musical life of Mobile’s black community.

== Performing and teaching ==
By the spring of 1900, Mary Europe was completing her own studies at the M Street High School. According to the federal census taken in June of that year, she and her mother resided together at 310 Oak Street in Washington, D.C. A 21-year-old student, Mason Clifford, also resided with them as a boarder.

Following her graduation from the Minor Normal School in 1902, she became the assistant pianist for the Park Temple Congregational Church. By 1901, she was accompanying the church’s choir as principal pianist and organist. Hired by her brother’s mentor, Joseph Douglass, to provide accompaniments for his performances, she also rendered the same services for Harry T. Burleigh and Clarence C. White.

From 1903 to 1944, Mary Europe was employed by the Dunbar High School (also known as “M Street High”). Initially hired as an accompanist for the school’s music ensembles, she was finally promoted to a position as a music educator a decade later. “From the 1890s until the 1940s,” according to Badger, Dunbar High “remained the best public high school for African-Americans in the United States, educating ‘more notable black professionals and public servants than any other high school in America,’” and inspiring 80 percent of its student body to pursue higher education.

During this phase of her life, her performing career received another boost when she was recruited to work with the Samuel Coleridge-Taylor Choral Society in 1904 as the accompanist for performances of Coleridge-Taylor's choral work, Hiawatha. She frequently received rave reviews for her performances from mainstream newspaper reviewers, including Walter B. Hayson, whose Evening Star column described her as “a young musician, but of decided genius” who “played the score of Hiawatha … with such precision, power and intelligence that she received the most cordial thanks of the soloists and almost extravagant commendation of the musical critics.”

In 1906, she was recruited by Samuel Coleridge-Taylor to accompany his ensemble once again – this time for the festival bearing the name of his ensemble, which was held from November 21 to 23 Washington’s Metropolitan A.M.E. Church. According to Badger, when the spring of 1907 arrived, the Freeman newspaper in Indianapolis “was including Mary Europe in its list of African-American instrumentalists of first rank.”

Still maintaining close ties to her family, Mary Europe resided with her mother and siblings, James, John and Ida at 1008 S Street, NW in Washington, D.C., from 1913 through 1919, but sadly, this latter year proved to be another one of great loss for the family. On May 9, Mary Europe’s brother, James Reese Europe, was murdered in Boston, Massachusetts, by a member of his band. It was a small comfort to the devastated Europe family when he was laid to rest with military honors just days later at the Arlington National Cemetery.

Before she had time to mourn her brother, Mary Europe then received word that her sister, Ida S. Europe, had also died. Following Ida's death in New York City on 26, 1919, her remains were also returned to Washington, D.C., for interment, according to burial records for the District of Columbia.

By the time of the 1920 federal census, Mary Europe was the only sibling still living at home with her mother. Also residing there at that time was her nephew, 8-year-old George Mayfield, the son of her older sister, Minnie.

== Life goes on ==
Through all of the ups and downs of her life, Mary Europe never gave up on her pursuit of a higher education degree. Using her summers to receive advanced training at Columbia University’s Teachers College, she finally earned her A. B. from Howard University in 1922. According to Badger, Mary Europe became “a much loved and admired teacher, who founded the Cantoren (a group of Dunbar graduates who regularly performed in the Washington area and appeared on the Major Bowes radio program)”:

During World War II she trained students for concert, radio, and army camp performances. Among her students were Lawrence Whisonant (Larry Winters), an internationally noted baritone; Turner Layton, an accomplished concert pianist and composer; and Frank Wess, an outstanding jazz instrumentalist and arranger. According to her students, Mary Europe possessed an absolute sense of pitch and could read and transpose accurately the most difficult music at sight.

By 1930, the grouping at the Europe’s home at 1008 S Street included a 60-year-old family matriarch, Loraine, and children John and Mary, as well as John and Mary’s nephew, George Mayfield. John was described as an orchestra musician while Mary was documented as a public school teacher.

== Death ==
Like her father and several siblings before her, Mary Lorraine Europe also suffered an untimely death, dying in 1947.

== External resources ==
- Davis, Ralph and Dr. Beverly Gordon. The M Street School, 1896-1916. 2010.
- “James Reese Europe,” in Encyclopedia of Alabama. Birmingham, Alabama: Alabama Humanities Foundation, retrieved online June 11, 2018.
