= Florence Emery Jones =

American jazz musician

- Born: 1892
- Died: 1932 (aged 39–40)
- Occupations: Jazz singer and dancer
- Known for: Career in Paris, inspired name of club Chez Florence

Florence Emery "Embry" Jones (1892 – 1932) was an American jazz singer and dancer, notable for her work in Paris during the 1920s. She was known for her elusive persona and for performing at Le Grand Duc and later at Chez Florence in Montmartre.

== Early life ==
Florence Emery Jones was born in 1892 and lived in Bridgeport, Connecticut for most of her youth. She moved to New York City as a performer before immigrating to Paris in 1920 to further her career.

== Career in Paris ==
Jones migrated to Paris to start a musical career. In the 1920s, African Americans in the United States were suffering from racial tension and segregation, while Paris was thought to be more tolerant and welcoming.

She became a well-known singer and dancer at Eugene Bullard's club, Le Grand Duc, where she achieved renown and praise. Jones would occasionally perform with her husband, musician Palmer Jones, who worked at the Ambassadeurs club at the time but would stop by Le Grand Duc after three in the morning. Part of Jones' allure was "a professional snobbishness which she deliberately cultivated," according to poet Langston Hughes, who briefly worked at the club as the second cook, and who stated "it was the first time I had ever seen a colored person deliberately and openly snubbing white people." Despite her reputation towards white patrons of Le Grand Duc, Hughes writes that outside of the club, Florence was kind and loved by all she worked with. It is likely that Hughes originated the spelling of Jones' maiden name "Emery" as "Embry" in his autobiography The Big Sea, a mistake which many scholars have repeated since.

Jones' attitude towards the clientele of Le Grand Duc led to a rocky relationship between her and managers of the club, and, ultimately, Jones left after choosing to defend a pregnant waitress who had been fired. It was then that Jones moved to Louis Mitchell's club.

Mitchell described her performances as riveting, and she gained further attention when Time magazine published a small excerpt about her beauty and talent, referring to her as having "Ivory-white [teeth], lipstick-red" and recognizing her as an expatriate of both hemispheres in 1927.

In 1924, Mitchell renamed the club Chez Florence, where Jones performed with her husband. This allowed her to attract high-profile visitors to her shows and increased her fanbase. Bullard replaced Jones with Ada "Bricktop" Smith at Le Grand Duc.

Chez Florence was one of the most fashionable nightclubs in Paris. Jones had a reputation for being difficult behind the scenes, but always delivered a professional performance. 1920s club-goer Ralph Nevill is cited in Tyler Edward Stovall's book Paris Noir: African Americans in the City of Light describing Chez Florence:

“Florence’s in the Rue Blanche, a late night resort which occupies the site of an old and charming garden, is crowded from midnight to dawn with revellers who have begun the night at other places. This is headquarters of the Charleston, which visitors willing or unwilling are sometimes made to dance . . . participation in the dance is one of the rules laid down by Florence, the half-caste who gives her name to the place. Such compulsory dancing, of course, produces ludicrous effects, the sight of an old gentleman in spectacles or a fat old South American lady covered with jewellery executing the Charleston, sending everyone into fits of laughter, the sound of which even the strident notes of the jazz band are powerless to drown.”

Jones was praised by several African American intellectuals, artists, and musicians, including Hughes, who referred to her as a "Petite, lovely brown vision, the reigning queen of Montmartre after midnight". He also praised Chez Florence, calling it a fashionable club.

== Personal life and death ==
Florence's husband, Palmer Jones, is said to have died of “chronic alcoholism” in Paris in 1928, potentially a reason for her to have left Paris and return to the United States. Another reason for Florence to move back was that her daughter, Dorothy, had remained in New York City.

At the age of 39, on January 3, 1932, Florence died due to heart failure in her apartment in New York "in relative poverty and anonymity".
