= Clef Club =

African-American venue in Harlem, New York

The Clef Club was an entertainment venue, society, and labour union for African-American musicians in Harlem, achieving its largest success in the 1910s. Incorporated by James Reese Europe, it was a combination musicians' hangout, fraternity club, labour exchange, and concert hall, across the street from Marshall's Hotel.

== History ==
=== Conception ===
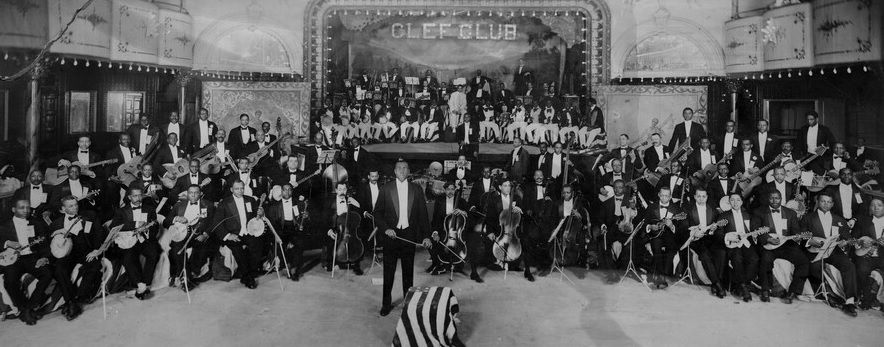
James Reese Europe and the Clef Club Orchestra at the Manhattan Casino, May 1911

The Clef Club was founded by James Reese Europe and his associates on April 11, 1910. The intention behind the creation of the Clef Club was to create an organization that allowed and offered Black American musicians opportunities—similar to other labour unions like the American Federation of Musicians at the time that was only offered to white musicians—to connect with potential employers and higher paying jobs. During early April 1910 at the Marshall Hotel—a hot spot for black musicians to meet and trade information—Jimmy Marshall, the owner of said hotel, told those musicians to find a spot for themselves. Thus James Reese Europe and other Marshall Hotel regulars formed what is now known as the Clef Club. In February 1912 the club came out with a preamble:

We, the members of said organization, have established, organized, and incorporated the Clef Club of the City of New York, in order to inculcate the science of vocal and instrumental music, technique, and execution of vocal and instrumental music, and to promote good fellowship and social intercourse.

Soon after the club's conception on April 28, 1910, Lester Walton released an article on the New York Age exclaiming that membership of the organization had reached upwards of 135.

=== Historical significance ===
==== Reception ====
The initial reception from black musicians in New York was positive. However, There were many problems that James Reese Europe and his associates had to face. The first included raising money in order to rent out office space for conducting their operations. Annual picnic and dance events that combine games, sports, vaudeville and minstrel acts, as well as food—such as those hosted by the C.V.B.A. (Coloured Vaudeville Benevolent Association)—had been shown to produce a high return on investment, thus James Reese Europe and his contemporaries believed that a similar gathering including performances by Clef Club members could work. From this proposal came the novel idea, at the time, to have "a symphony-sized concert orchestra composed entirely of black musicians." on May 27, 1910, the Clef Club's "Musical Melange and Dance-fest" would take place and would also be the first time that the Clef Club Orchestra would perform. Reviews of their performance were strikingly positive. Critics claimed that the players showed the capability of African American musician's ability to "playing music as it is written".

==== Clef Club today ====
Unfortunately, the Clef Club no longer exists in New York, having died out sometime in the mid-1920s. There is however the Philadelphia Clef Club of Jazz and Performing Arts located at the corner of South Broad Street and Fitzwater Street.

== Clef Club Orchestra ==
The Clef Club Orchestra, as previously stated, arose from the initial fundraising event for club office space and club activities. The orchestra was conducted by James Reese Europe, co-conducted by William H. Tyres, and included upwards of 125 musicians consisting of a wide variety of instruments. Among the instruments included the normal orchestral instruments of violins, violas, cellos, basses, and the normal wind and brass instruments, but also included mandolins, guitars, banjos, ukuleles, and a large bass drum. The orchestra included "thirty strummers- ten each of mandolins, guitars and a rare harp guitar, and banjos." The orchestra was also frequently joined by a men's chorus, ten different pianists led by Will H. Dixon, and various soloists.

=== Performance at Carnegie Hall ===
The Clef Club orchestra performed in 1912–1915 on the stage of Carnegie Hall in New York City. This concert stands as a crowning achievement for both the orchestra as well as Europe, while also being one of the most difficult challenges for this all African-American band. The initial proposal came from critic and journalist Lester Walton as he stated that the Clef Club Orchestra is "well qualified to give a symphony concert at Carnegie Hall or Mendelssohn Hall, and before a critical audience" within the New York Age, November 16, 1911. However, the idea of performing at Carnegie Hall started to manifest when David Mannes and James Reese Europe discussed a benefit concert for the Music Settlement School in Harlem. Mannes, a white American violinist, conductor, and community organizer, argued to Europe that having the Clef Club Orchestra perform at a venue like Carnegie Hall would advance the Harlem School by demonstrating that black musicians could hold a dignified concert.

The concert itself included the 125 piece orchestra conducted by Europe, a large chorus of 150 voices specially trained by Will Marion Cook, as well as a smaller 40 piece choir conducted by organist Paul C. Bohlen. Additionally there were performances by baritone Harry Burleigh, pianist and composer J. Rosamond Johnson, and the Versatile Entertainers' Quintet amongst others. Selections from the orchestra included: "Clef Club March", by Europe; "On Bended Knee", by Henry T. Burleigh; "Silhouettes, Dancing Shadows", and "Maori-Samoan Dance", by Tyers; "Benefactors' March", by Europe; "Tout a Vous", waltz, by Tyers; "West Virginia Dance", by Wm. H. Vodery; and "Deep River", by Samuel Coleridge-Taylor.

This performance—the first of many—resulting in raising $5,000 for the Music Settlement School in Harlem simply because the performance was so well received. Even more conservative music critics and papers such as the Musical America chose to praise their work, while still managing to condescendingly praise their performers by for instance stating that their accomplishments were a result of "that spirit of exuberance and freedom of fancy that mark the natures of these natural-born musicians."

== Notable members ==
- Joe Jordan, Bandleader
- Ford Dabney, Bandleader
- Egbert Thompson, Bandleader
- Arthur "Happy" Rhone, Bandleader
- Tom Bethel, Vocalist
- Henry Creamer, Vocalist
- George Walker, Jr., Vocalist
- Clarence Williams, Pianist
- Irving "Kid Sneeze" Williams, Pianist
- John Europe (Jim's older brother), Pianist
- Will H. Dixon, Bandleader (Original Dancing Ragtime Orchestra Conductor) pianist (virtuoso)
