= Puritan Records =

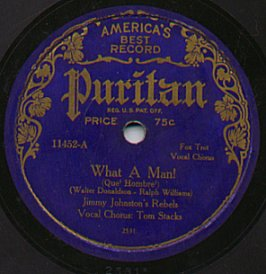
- Founded: 1917
- Defunct: 1929
- Status: Inactive
- Genre: Jazz
- Country of origin: U.S.

Puritan Records was an American record label which lasted from 1917 to 1929. For most of its existence Puritan was a product of the Wisconsin Chair Company, which also marketed Paramount Records, but as a label, Puritan briefly predates Paramount and began with United Phonographs Corporation.

== History ==
Frederick Dennett, founder of the Wisconsin Chair Company, had been manufacturing phonograph cabinets for Edison for several years when he decided to get into the record business himself. After selling one of his manufacturing plants to Edison, Dennett organized the United Phonographs Corporation in late 1916 and went into the production of phonograph models at the Lake Side Craft Shops building at 12th Street and Kentucky Avenue in Sheboygan, Wisconsin. By March 1917, United Phonographs began advertising the sale of phonographs and records utilizing the Puritan trademark. Vertical-cut Puritans of this era are so scarce that little is known of their provenance, though the consensus is that they must have come from other vertical-cut companies, as Wisconsin Chair is not known to have a recording studio in operation before 1919. However, they were capable of pressing records at Wisconsin Chair's Grafton, Wisconsin facility, from 1917. This operation was formally incorporated as the New York Recording Laboratories in June of that year.

But the Puritan label, its phonographs and related business the Colonial Phonograph Company all belonged to subsidiary divisions of Wisconsin Chair. In 1919, Art Satherley established a studio in New York City for the New York Recording Laboratories (often abbreviated as 'NYRL') and Wisconsin Chair truly entered the record market with its in-house label, Paramount Records. Although the release sequence was fudged by a number of factors, from the time both companies began issuing laterals Puritan's releases were mostly issued in lockstep with Paramount, with some considerable exceptions.

Frederick Dennett died in 1920, and in 1922 his successors at United Phonographs Corporation decided to get out of the phonograph business, at which point the Puritan imprint transferred to Wisconsin Chair. For a time afterwards, Puritan records were being pressed by both NYRL in Grafton and by the Bridgeport Die and Machine Company (commonly abbreviated as 'BD&M') in Bridgeport, CT. The NYRL masters were also published on dozens of other labels that were serviced by BD&M such as Banner Records, Triangle and Paramount's sister labels Broadway Records and Famous.

BD&M went bankrupt in 1925, and NYRL dissolved by court order on January 1, 1926. Yet Puritan continued to operate until 1929, using masters from companies such as Regal Records (1921). Puritan's releases reflected the output of Paramount's New York facility, issuing mainstream dance records and popular songs. It continued to do so, for a short time, after the parent label turned its undivided attention to country music and blues, recorded in and around Chicago and by Gennett Records in Richmond, Indiana.

== Label Design and numbering systems ==
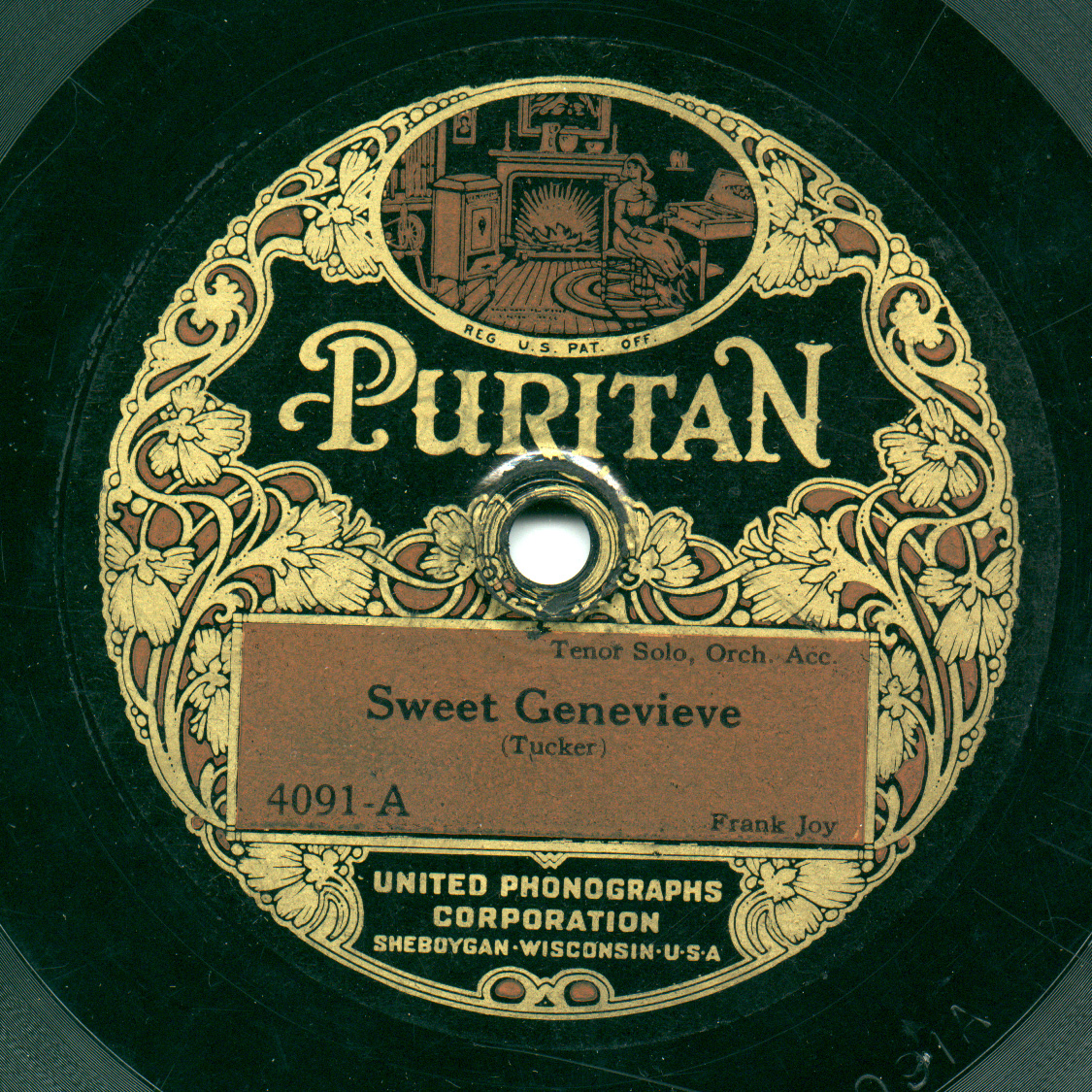
"Sweet Genevieve" by Frank Joy

United Phonographs-era Puritans employ at least three, distinct label designs. The four-colour vertical-cut label features tan and blue overprinting on a light grey background with an inset image of a pilgrim woman listening to her phonograph at fireside; the words "Vertical Cut" appear in red type. With the advent of laterals, the image of the pilgrim woman was kept, but surrounded by fancy lacework in a label printed in varying degrees of gold and black. Near the end of the United Phonographs period, the inset image was replaced by a legend, "America's Best Record." This was retained, with a small amount of the lacework, on the far simpler label design used by NYRL which is gold on blue, similar to Paramount's own design. Around 1925, the label changed from gold on blue to gold on black. BD&M pressings, however, employ their own unique label design of gold and white on black, with an inset profile of the Puritan of legend in a broad-brimmed hat.

Very little information is available about the numbering systems of the earliest Puritans and Paramounts, though vertical-cut Puritans were numbered in the 2000s. With switching to lateral-cut in 1919, Puritan ran at least three concurrent series, 6000 for classical, 9000 for light music and 11000 for popular, though the classical line didn't last beyond 1923. The Puritan 11000 series corresponds to releases in the Paramount 20000 series and the 9000 series reflects Paramount's 33000 series; there are other Puritan series known in number blocks of 500 and 70000. Once BD&M gets into the mix, the numerical relationship between Puritan and Paramount becomes considerably disturbed, with different records sharing the same numbers. About 1923, the 11000 system stabilizes until the end, the highest known Puritan release in the pop series being 11819 in 1929. By then the parallel pop release program on Paramount had already concluded.

== Legacy ==
Like the products of its parent, Puritan records are relatively scarce, although they are more common than Paramounts. None of the country or Downhome blues for which Paramount is now famous appeared on Puritan. It was devoted to popular and dance selections, made by usual suspect orchestras based in New York City such as those of Ben Selvin, Joseph Samuels, Nathan Glantz, Eddie Davis (working out of Mike Markel's orchestra), Harry Yerkes and so forth. A large part of Puritan's release schedule was also carried on more common labels such as Plaza Music's Banner Records or scarcer imprints such as Broadway and Triangle. Puritan is a desirable imprint for some collectors and it is of value in the light it sheds on Paramount; from a discographical standpoint it is of interest as so many aspects of Puritan's release schedule remain unresolved. However, nothing on Puritan enters into the high dollar value accorded to the country and blues releases on Paramount proper, though certain items, such by Lucille Hegamin, King Oliver, Ford Dabney, W. C. Handy and some early Fletcher Henderson and Duke Ellington titles, are not negligible in that regard.

Quality of sound tends to vary on Puritan. BD&M pressings sound better, but are more fragile, whereas NYRL Wisconsin pressings are more durable, but are noisier owing to the high amount of filler in the shellac formula.

In 1972, record collector Dave Samuelson licensed the name for an independent label devoted to American roots and bluegrass music. It used the same typeface, label and logo design as later Puritan issues of the 1920s, but bore no other relationship to the earlier label. Originally based in Evanston, Illinois, it moved to Battle Ground, Indiana in 1975 and ceased operations in 1981.

== See also ==
- List of record labels
