= Too Much Mustard =

- Turkey trot by Cecil Macklin
- Published: 1911

"Too Much Mustard" or "Tres Moutarde" is a turkey trot composed by Cecil Macklin in 1911. It was a hit on both sides of the Atlantic in the early 20th century, and continues to be performed often. The song was also often performed as early jazz. Performers included Prince's Band, Victor Military Band, Joe "Fingers" Car, Paul Whiteman and Teresa Brewer.

Fred Astaire and Ginger Rogers dance to the song in The Story of Vernon and Irene Castle.
