= The Story of Vernon and Irene Castle =

1939 film by H. C. Potter

- Theatrical release poster
- Directed by: H. C. Potter
- Screenplay by: Richard Sherman; Oscar Hammerstein II; Dorothy Yost
- Based on: My Husband; 1919 book by Irene Castle
- Produced by: George Haight
- Starring: Fred Astaire; Ginger Rogers; Edna May Oliver; Walter Brennan
- Cinematography: Robert de Grasse
- Edited by: William Hamilton
- Music by: Various
- Distributed by: RKO Radio Pictures
- Release date: April 28, 1939 (US)
- Running time: 93 minutes
- Country: United States
- Language: English
- Budget: $1,196,000 (est.)
- Box office: $1,825,000

The Story of Vernon and Irene Castle is a 1939 American biographical musical comedy film directed by H.C. Potter. The film stars Fred Astaire, Ginger Rogers, Edna May Oliver, and Walter Brennan. The film is based on the stories My Husband and My Memories of Vernon Castle, by Irene Castle. The movie was adapted by Oscar Hammerstein II, Dorothy Yost and Richard Sherman. It was Astaire and Rogers' ninth and last film together with RKO. Their final pairing was The Barkleys of Broadway (1949) at MGM.

== Plot ==
The film tells of novice American dancer Irene Foote, who convinces New York-based British vaudeville comic Vernon Castle to give up slapstick comedy in favor of sophisticated ballroom dancing.

Their big break comes when they are stranded in Paris, along with their friend, Walter Ashe, with no money. They catch the eye of influential agent Maggie Sutton, who arranges a tryout for them at the prestigious Café de Paris, where they become an overnight sensation. After taking Europe by storm, the Castles return to the United States and become just as big a sensation. Their fame and fortune rises to unprecedented heights in the immediate pre-World War I years.

When World War I starts, Vernon returns to Britain and joins the Royal Flying Corps, while Irene makes patriotic movie serials to aid the war effort. However, Vernon is killed in a training accident, leaving Irene to carry on alone.

== Cast ==
- Fred Astaire as Vernon Castle
- Ginger Rogers as Irene Castle (née Foote)
- Edna May Oliver as Maggie Sutton
- Walter Brennan as Walter Ash
- Lew Fields as himself
- Etienne Girardot as Papa Aubel
- Janet Beecher as Mrs. Foote
- Rolfe Sedan as Emile Aubel
- Leonid Kinskey as Artist
- Robert Strange as Dr. Hubert Foote
- Douglas Walton as Student Pilot
- Clarence Derwent as Papa Louis
- Sonny Lamont as Charlie, Tap Dancer
- Frances Mercer as Claire Ford
- Victor Varconi as Grand Duke
- Donald MacBride as Hotel Manager
- Leyland Hodgson as British Sergeant
- Lillian Yarbo as Mary, Claire's Maid (uncredited)

== Production ==
Irene Castle acted as advisor to this film, and constantly disagreed with the director as to details of costuming and liberties taken. When informed that white actor Walter Brennan was to play the part of faithful servant Walter, she was dumbfounded: the real Walter was black.

The film marks several "firsts": the characters in it are more realistic than usual in an Astaire-Rogers film, there is none of the usual "screwball comedy" relief provided by such actors as Edward Everett Horton, Victor Moore, or Helen Broderick, it is the only Astaire-Rogers musical biography, the only one on which Oscar Hammerstein II worked, the only one of their musicals with a tragic ending, and the only one in which Astaire's character dies.

Astaire and Rogers dance to the Cecil Macklin song Too Much Mustard.

== Reception ==
The film was popular in the US, making $1,120,000 and it also earned $705,000 elsewhere. However, due to high costs RKO accounts recorded the film as losing $50,000.
