= Charles A. Prince =

American musician (1868–1937)

Charles Adams Prince
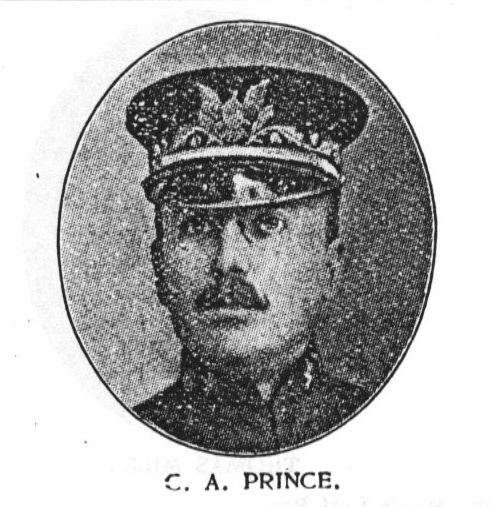

Background information
- Birth name: Charles Adams Prince
- Also known as: Charles Adams
- Born: December 27, 1868; San Francisco (CA)
- Died: October 08, 1937; Colma (CA)
- Genres: ragtime, popular, classical
- Occupation(s): conductor, bandleader, musician, record company executive
- Instrument(s): piano, celeste, organ
- Years active: 1891–1937
- Labels: Columbia, Victor

Charles Adams Prince (December 27, 1868; October 08, 1937) was an American conductor, bandleader, pianist and organist known for conducting the Columbia Orchestra and, later, Prince's Band and Orchestra. He made his first recordings, as a pianist, in 1891 for the New York Phonograph Company. Later in the 1890s he worked as a musical director for Columbia Records. He also conducted the Columbia Orchestra and Columbia Band starting in 1904 as the successor of the cornetist Tom Clark.

In 1905, Prince assembled the ensembles Prince's Band, Prince's Orchestra, and the Banda Espanola. They principally recorded for Columbia's disc releases and performed much of the same music as the Columbia Band, which was given over for cylinder recording to the veteran flutist and conductor George Schweinfest. Prince's own composition, "The Barbary Rag", was recorded by the band in 1913.

Prince's Band was the first to record many compositions that became jazz standards. Their version of W. C. Handy's "Saint Louis Blues" in 1915 is the first known recording of the song. It took the band two sessions to record a successful take, which was considered unusual considering the talent of the band and its leader. Another song by Handy, "The Memphis Blues", was recorded by Prince's Band in 1914, a week after its first recording by the Victor Military Band. Other standards introduced by the band are Porter Steele's "High Society" (1911) and Lew Pollack and Ray Gilbert's "That's a Plenty" (1914). His band also played the popular instrumental "Too Much Mustard" released by Columbia and Sears's Oxford Records.

Prince recorded as a solo celeste player under the name Charles Adams. As such, his recording of "Silver Threads Among the Gold" was popular.

At Columbia, Prince also showed initiative in expanding the company's "classical" orchestral catalogue and in experimenting with the size of ensembles that acoustic recording equipment could capture. In October 1910 he conducted an abbreviated version of Franz Schubert's Symphony No. 8 in B Minor, popularly known as the Unfinished Symphony, on two sides of a 12-inch disc (released as Columbia A 5267), which was the first orchestral recording of any part of a symphony. He assembled a 90-piece orchestra to record the overture to Richard Wagner's opera Rienzi in February 1917 (released as Columbia A 6006), which was the largest ensemble commercially recorded to that date. Prince's last recording for Columbia was in 1922. He then changed labels to Puritan Records and later to Victor Records, where he worked as associate musical director.

Prince was related to the U.S. presidents John Adams and John Quincy Adams.
