= One-Step =

Ballroom dance

The One-Step was a ballroom dance popular in social dancing at the beginning of the 20th century.

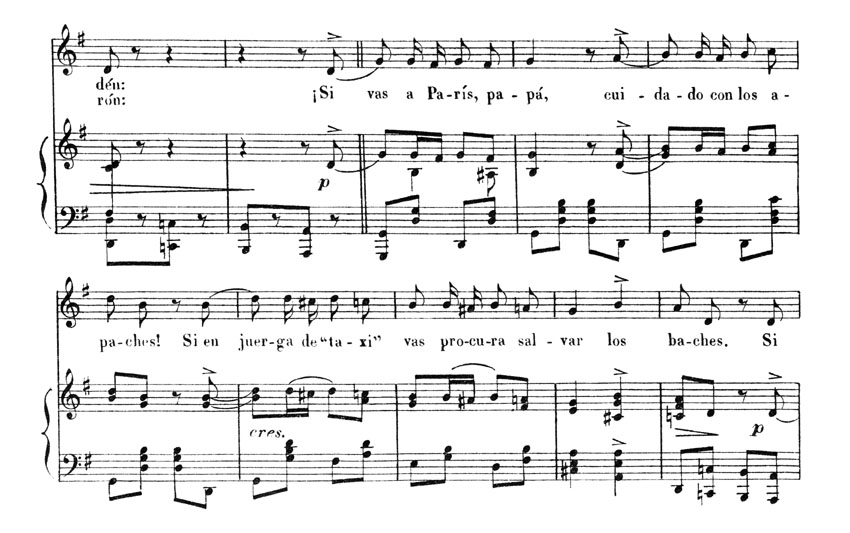
¡Si vas a París, papá!

Troy Kinney writes that One-Step originated from the Turkey Trot dance, with all mannerisms of the latter removed, so that "of the original 'trot' nothing remains but the basic step".

The One-Step included the following basic figures (and a number of more advanced ones):

- The Castle Walk (invented and introduced by Mr. and Mrs. Vernon Castle).
- The Turn is a walking step, pivoting on one foot to change direction. The right foot comes from the preceding step to the place of starting; while it makes two successive long steps the left foot turns “on its place”. The turn's completion brings the right foot into anterior fourth position. The woman's steps are the converse of the man's, her left foot making the long steps, while her right foot turns on its place. The turn gains smoothness by means of allowing the right knees to touch each other lightly.
- The Dip. Starting with (say) the right foot in posterior fourth position: during the first beat, sink; on the second beat, rise, transferring the weight to the left (advanced) foot, gliding the right foot up to third position, on arriving at which it instantly receives the weight again, if the dip is to be repeated. In that case the left foot again glides to anterior fourth position, and the step is effected as before. Frequently several dips are made in succession. They often succeed a turn, the latter's finish leaving the feet in appropriate (fourth) position for the purpose. The dip is executed in any direction, with the performers in any position of the couple. It occurs in other dances, but its technique is always the same.
- The Grapevine
- The One-Step Eight, so called from the number of beats it occupies, is a simple walk, with turn. The man's steps are the converse of the woman's; she pivots on her right foot, he on his left foot. Executed in closed position of the couple.
- The Square, originally a Tango figure, is equally effective in the One-Step. (1) From posterior third position, the right foot steps to anterior fourth position; (2) left foot glides to second position; (3) right foot glides into first position; (4) left foot steps back to posterior fourth position; (5) right foot steps to anterior third position. It is usually repeated several times. Executed in closed position of the couple. Execution of the figure occupies two measures of music; steps done in half-time.
