= Zoe Barnett =

American actress (1883–1969)

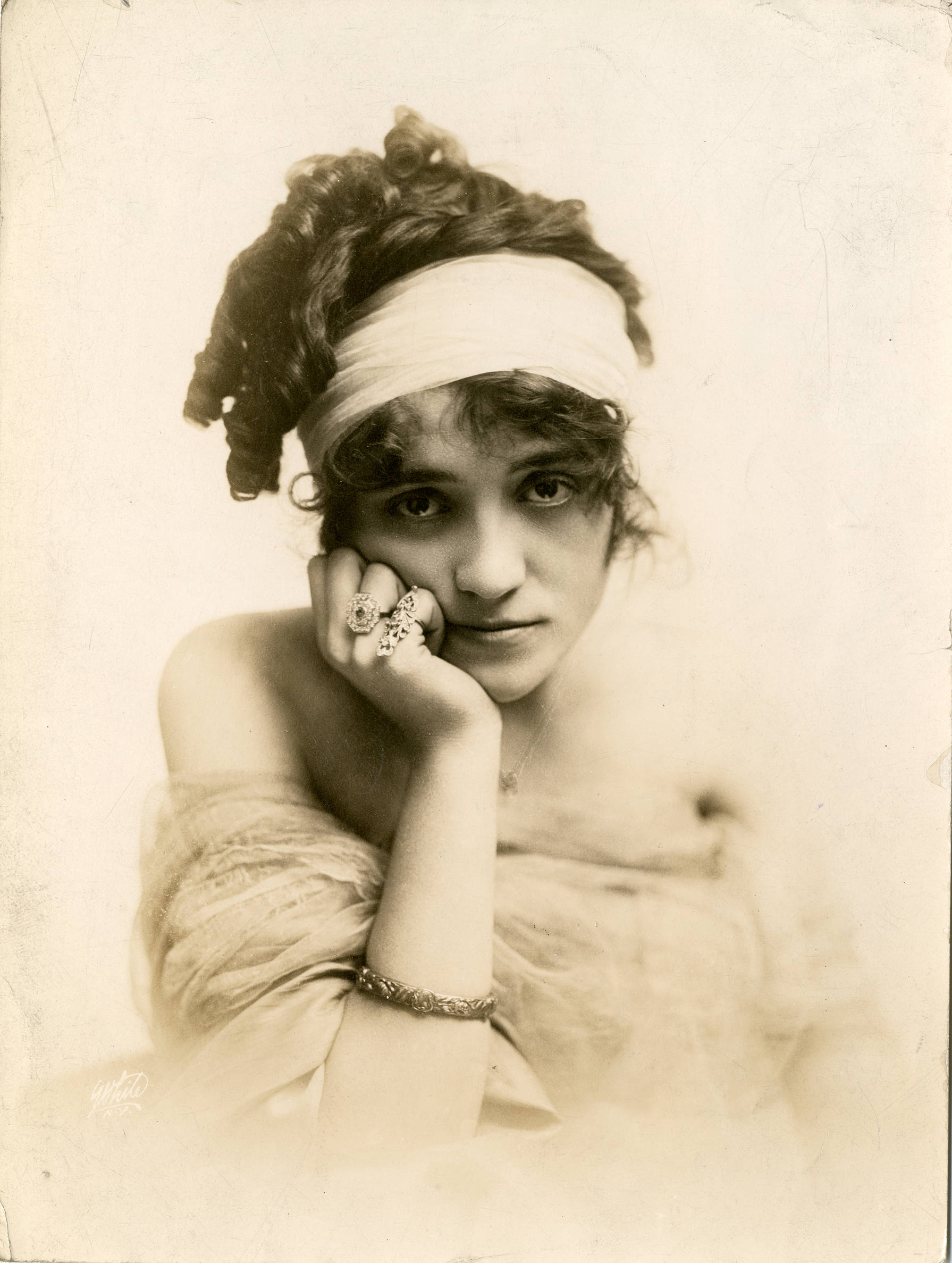
Zoe Barnett, c. 1912

Ellen Zoe Barnett (1883 – December 19, 1969) was an American actress in musical comedies.

== Early life ==
Barnett was from Glendale, California. She sang in local church choirs as a young woman.

== Career ==
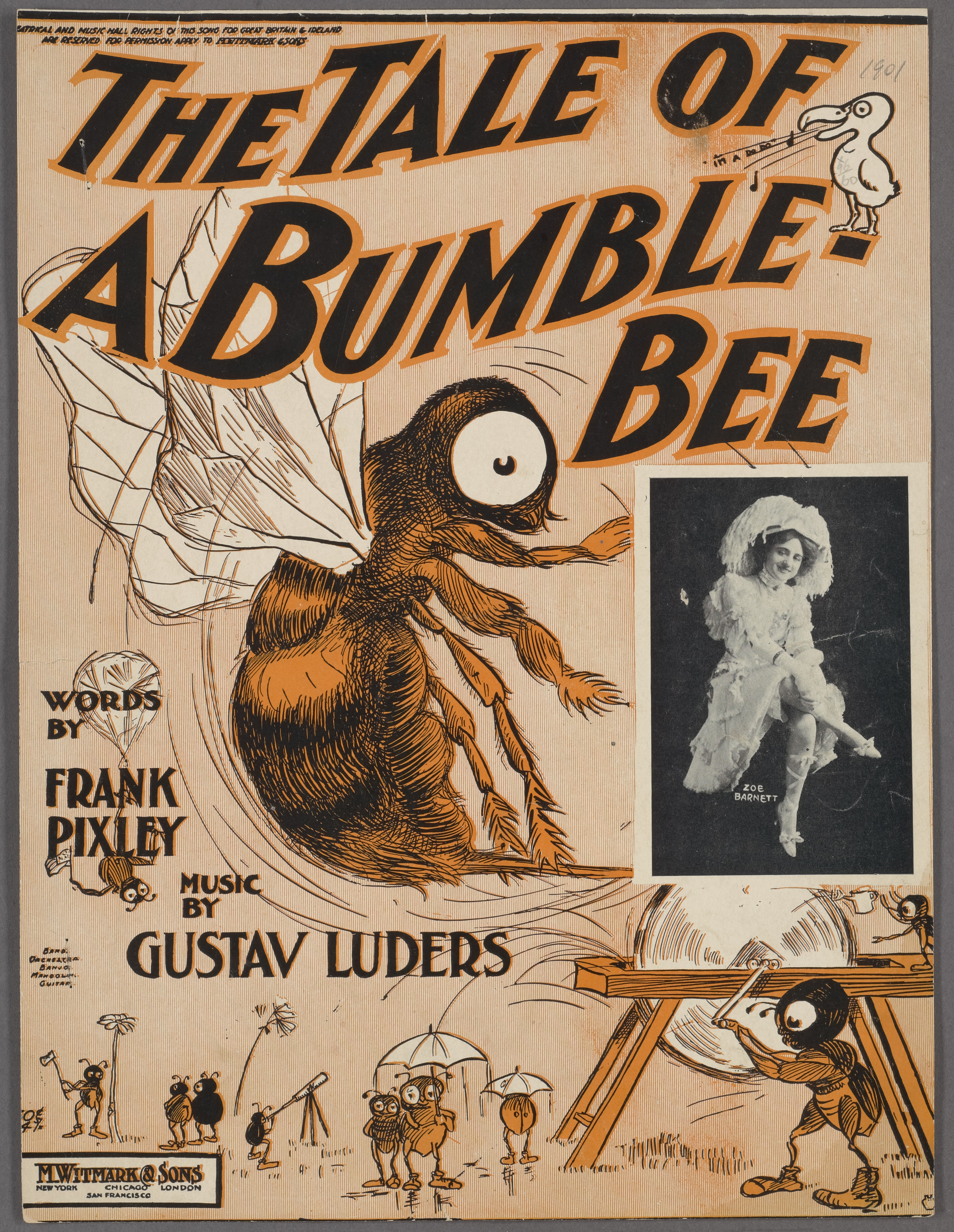
Barnett on the cover of sheet music for "The tale of a bumblebee"

Barnett began her stage career in Los Angeles and San Francisco, until 1909, when she began working in national touring productions. Broadway credits for Barnett included appearances in All Aboard (1913), The Midnight Girl (1914), The Debutante (1914–1915), Jim Jam Jems (1920–1921), The Rose Girl (1921), and Blossom Time (1921–1923). "She is a clever young woman, a natural comedienne, a graceful dancer, and a real actress," declared a Louisiana newspaper, continuing, "if she were not a musical comedy prima donna and comedienne she could be an emotional actress." She said of her own appearance, "I'm dark, therefore I'm sinister. I've always wanted to play schoolgirl roles, wear frilly frocks and act innocently, but when a manager sets eyes on me he has in mind some particularly wicked woman for me to personate."

== Personal life ==
Zoe Barnett was married twice. Her first husband was actor Wayne Nunn; they divorced in 1919. She married a second time in 1924, to actor and playwright William M. Pinkham, after being named as co-respondent in his divorce from playwright Frances Nordstrom. She retired from the professional stage after marrying Pinkham; but she was active in producing plays for the Sorosis chapter in Patchogue, New York. She was widowed when Pinkham died in 1958. Zoe Barnett Pinkham died in 1969, aged 86 years, at a nursing home in Port Jefferson, New York. Her papers are archived in the New York State Historical Documents Library in Albany, New York.
