= Nobody (1905 song) =

Song by Arthur Collins
- Recorded: May 22, 1905
- Studio: Victor Records
- Length: 2:56
- Label: Victor #4391
- Songwriters: Bert Williams (music); Alex Rogers (lyrics)

Arthur Collins recorded "Nobody" for the Victor label (no. 4391) on May 22, 1905.

"Nobody" is a popular song with music by Bert Williams and lyrics by Alex Rogers, published in 1905. The song was first publicly performed in February 1906, in the Broadway production Abyssinia. The show, which included live camels, premièred at the Majestic Theater and continued the string of hits for the vaudeville team of Williams and Walker.

"Nobody" became Bert Williams' signature theme, and the song that he is best remembered for today. It is a doleful and ironic composition, replete with his dry observational wit, and is complemented by Williams' intimate, half-spoken singing style. Williams became so identified with the song that he was obliged to sing it in almost every appearance for the rest of his life. He considered its success both blessing and curse: "Before I got through with 'Nobody', I could have wished that both the author of the words and the assembler of the tune had been strangled or drowned... 'Nobody' was a particularly hard song to replace."

"Nobody" remained active in Columbia Records' sales catalogue into the 1930s, and musicologist Tim Brooks estimates that it sold between 100,000 and 150,000 copies, a phenomenally high amount for the era.

== Racial context ==
Bert Williams (left) and George Walker (right)

"Nobody" embodies the struggle that Bert Williams and George Walker went through during their lives both as citizens and performers on the vaudeville stage. As black men living during the Jim Crow era when blacks were openly disenfranchised, Williams and Walker used their platform to protest such flagrant racism. Off the stage, they were accomplished individuals who tried to separate themselves as distinguished and sophisticated; thus, defying the pervasive stereotypes of black men. Traveling as a performer, Williams faced issues with hotels not letting him use the same elevators or facilities as whites, and white performers not wanting to perform with him. He took those experiences to the stage with him, giving the audience his real life that they could relate to. As the businessman of the group, Walker was in charge of managing and handling the dealings of Williams and Walker Co. He likewise experienced the realities of being black in a business that did not cater to black performers. Trying to combat their own realities and the known condition of blacks in America, Williams used the song as a statement. Debuting in Abyssinia, the song was part of an effort to regain legitimacy and agency for the black community.

Much like their other shows, Abyssinia was an attempt to bring attention to black excellence, specifically in Africa. The historical Abyssinia, or the Ethiopian empire, was dominant from about 1270 to 1974. Showing reverence to the Empire, Williams and Walker set out to put its dominance on display so that their audience would not only be educated, but also empowered by its greatness. It represented a resurgence of the black community in America, as it was a symbol of greatness. It was also a symbol for the longevity and depth of roots that blacks have, giving black Americans the confidence and mentality to succeed in the midst of oppression. The show Abyssinia was a smash hit, intertwining the depths and gravity of the historical narrative with the common stereotypes, drenched in drama and humor. The Topeka Daily Capital wrote about the shows debut that "the complications arising are varied and many, and furnish the theme of Abyssinia, the latest and by far the best vehicle in which these clever colored comedians ever appeared." This musical was one of the highlighted works of their careers, showing off their talent along with their awareness of their common plight, situated within an overarching historical narrative.

Williams uses "Nobody" as the counter to the stereotype that whites had about blacks at the time. During slavery, many stereotypes were formed to justify the racist actions against blacks to keep them at the bottom of the social totem pole. Stemming from images, phrases and common beliefs, the stereotypes held power and weight, as they were the force and the background behind much of the daily encounters that whites had with blacks even after the end of slavery. These stereotypes did not even have to make sense. "For instance, an enslaved person forced under violence to work from sunrise to sunset could hardly be described as 'lazy,' yet laziness, as well as characteristics of docility, backwardness, lasciviousness, treachery, and dishonesty, historically became characteristic of African Americans." As social classes were beginning to form, and the middle class was emerging, whites felt pressured to thwart the growth of blacks, using these stereotypes in any way that could be justified. As a result, these beliefs crept their way into the entertainment industry and onto the vaudeville stage, as blackface minstrelsy was becoming increasingly popular. Scholar Alan Trachtenberg asserts that "new social roles developed for culture. Changes in social structure, the polarization of rich and poor, and the growth of a salaried middle class anxious about its own opportunity — indeed, created the necessity — for the healing properties identified within high culture." Bert Williams took note of the changing culture, and used the stereotypes to work both for and against the white people in his audience.

== Lyrical implications ==
Analyzing the lyrics from the mindset of Williams, he takes the realities of poor blacks in America as the theme. Performing on Broadway, he and Walker were able to break racial barriers to gather both blacks and whites in the same theatre. In Dahomey was their debut on Broadway, which gained recognition and publicity, as The New York Times headlined, "Williams and Walker Make and Opening at the New York Theatre and Hold It: All Negro Book and Music Played by and All-Negro Cast – The Negroes in the Audience Were in Heaven." Using that success, they prided themselves on appealing to the entire social spectrum. Therefore, Williams was intent in making the narrative relatable to blacks that were fortunate enough to be in his audience. Taking on the character of a lowly, lazy, lonely black man who has lived through hardships, he plays into the stereotypes that white people created. Dressed in blackface, as he always did performing alongside Walker, he embraced the racist caricature with the intent to walk the fine lines between humiliation, assimilation and humor. The lyrics are a tale of reality just as much as they are a cry for help. On the surface level, Williams is pleading for direct, personal attention and companionship. However, digging deeper into the context, he is asking for the American society to extend a welcoming hand to blacks. He is revealing much of himself, being vulnerable, genuine all while maintaining his comedic flair.

Although the song was published in 1905, the lyrics are similar to a poem "The Bachelor's Complaint" that appeared in The American Musical Times, Volume 4, Number 6, June 1894, page 8. The first lines read: "Returning home at close of day / Who gently chides my long delay, / And by my side delights to stay? / Nobody! ". No author is given; the magazine editor is D. O. Evans.

== Lyrics ==
The lyrics for the song are as follows:

When life seems full of clouds an' rain
and I am filled with naught but pain,
who soothes my thumpin' bumpin' brain ?
Nobody

When winter comes with snow an' sleet,
and me with hunger and cold feet,
who says " Ah, here's two bits, go an' eat!"
Nobody

I ain't never done nothin' to nobody,
I ain't never got nothin' from nobody, no time!
And until I get somethin' from somebody, sometime,
I don't intend to do nothin' for nobody, no time!

When I try hard an' scheme an' plan,
to look as good as I can,
who says " Ah, look at that handsome man!"
Nobody

When all day long things go amiss,
and I go home to find some bliss,
who hands to me a glowin' kiss?
Nobody

I ain't never done nothin' to nobody,
I ain't never got nothin' from nobody, no time!
And until I get somethin' from somebody, sometime,
I don't intend to do nothin' for nobody, no time!

Nobody, no time!

== Recorded versions ==
- Bert Williams (1906; 1913, feat. in the Broadway Show "Ziegfeld Follies")
- Randy Crawford (1979, Raw Silk)
- Shelton Brooks (1941)
- Red Foley (1941)
- Carol Burnett
- Arthur Collins (1905) (Victor no. 4391)
- Ry Cooder (1978) added "Nobody Knows the Trouble I See" to open his version of the song
- Mary Coughlan
- Phil Harris
- Bing Crosby mastered by Decca Records in March 1947 from a version recorded for Crosby's radio show Philco Radio Time. It was actually broadcast on April 2, 1947.
- Perry Como (1955)
- Jimmy Dean (1962)
- Nina Simone (1964) in her album Broadway-Blues-Ballads
- Avon Long (1976, feat. in the Broadway show "Bubbling Brown Sugar")
- Billy Daniels (1977, feat. in the London show "Bubbling Brown Sugar")
- Gonzo (The Muppet Show, season 1 episode 14)
- The Four Lads (1960)
- Lynne Thigpen (1980 feat. in the Broadway show "Tintypes" as part of the medley "Outside Looking In")
- Johnny Cash (2000)
- Merle Travis
- Cécile McLorin Salvant
