= Will Accooe =

American musician and composer

- Born: Will Accooe; 1874; Winchester, Virginia
- Died: April 26, 1904 (aged 29–30)
- Occupation: Musician

Willis J. Accooe (1874 – April 26, 1904) was an African American performing musician and composer, mainly of musicals. He was "an important songwriter during the birth of the black musical" according to the Library of Congress website.

== Life and career ==
He was born in Winchester, Virginia to preacher John Harris Accooe and Anna Accooe. He married fellow musician and performer Alice Mackey. He studied at Princess Anne Academy in Maryland.

He played organ at the 1897 Tennessee Centennial Exposition, and his composition Tennessee Centennial March proved greatly successful.

Accooe was musical director for John William Isham's Octoroons, a popular quasi-minstrel troupe, and was musical director for productions with Bert Williams. With Bob Cole and Billy Johnson he produced A Trip to Coontown in 1898, "the first New York musical written, produced, and performed by black artists". He wrote songs for the show and was its musical director. In addition to his other theatrical work, he also worked on Broadway musicals for white audiences, including The Belle of Bridgeport (1900), The Liberty Belles (1901), The Casino Girl (1900–1901).

He co-wrote a musical with Will Marion Cook entitled The Cannibal King (1901), but it was never produced. He was a co-composer for Harry B. Smith's musical comedy, The Liberty Belles, which was produced in 1901. He composed some of the music for the musical comedy Sons of Ham. During a 1903 production of the show by Avery and Hart (Dan Avery and Charles Hart), Accooe was the orchestra's conductor.

He wrote the comic opera The Volunteers in 1903, but fell ill and production was halted.

Accooee wrote his own funeral oration shortly before his death. He died at age 30 on April 26, 1904, in Brooklyn, New York.

== Selected compositions ==
- Chicken (1899), co-wrote
- Lulu: I loves yer, Lulu co-wrote (1901)
- Love Has Claimed Its Own (1901), co-wrote
- Black Patti Waltzes
- Ma Dandy Soldier Coon (1900)
- On the Road to Cairo Town (1903) co-wrote with James O'Dea
- In a Birch Canoe (1904)
- The Phrenologist Coon was released five times on Victor Records in recordings by either Bert Williams or Silas Leachman.
- Tennessee Centennial March (1897)

== See also ==
- African-American musical theater
