= Lester Walton =

American diplomat (1882–1965)

- Born: Lester Aglar Walton; April 20, 1882; St. Louis, Missouri, U.S.
- Died: October 16, 1965 (aged 83); New York City, U.S.
- Education: Sumner High School
- Occupations: Multi-faceted career that included foundational work in film criticism and sportswriting, Broadway songwriting, politics, civil rights, international diplomacy
- Known for: Groundbreaking number of firsts, while making a significant contribution to multiple fields: First full-time Black journalist; First full-time Black arts critic; First full-time Black sportswriter; Successful advocate for capitalizing the word 'Negro'

Lester Aglar Walton (April 20, 1882 – October 16, 1965) was a St. Louis-born Harlem Renaissance polymath and intellectual, a well-known figure in his day, who advanced civil rights in significant and prescient ways in journalism, entertainment, politics, diplomacy and elsewhere. The New York Times called him an "authority on Negro affairs." Historian Susan Curtis describes him as a man who "advised U.S. presidents and industrialists ... [and] was instrumental in desegregating housing" in New York City. As "America's first black reporter for a local daily," Walton also became the first full-time Black sportswriter and the first Black journalist to cover golf and the nascent sport of pre-1910 basketball.

Two of Walton's Workplaces

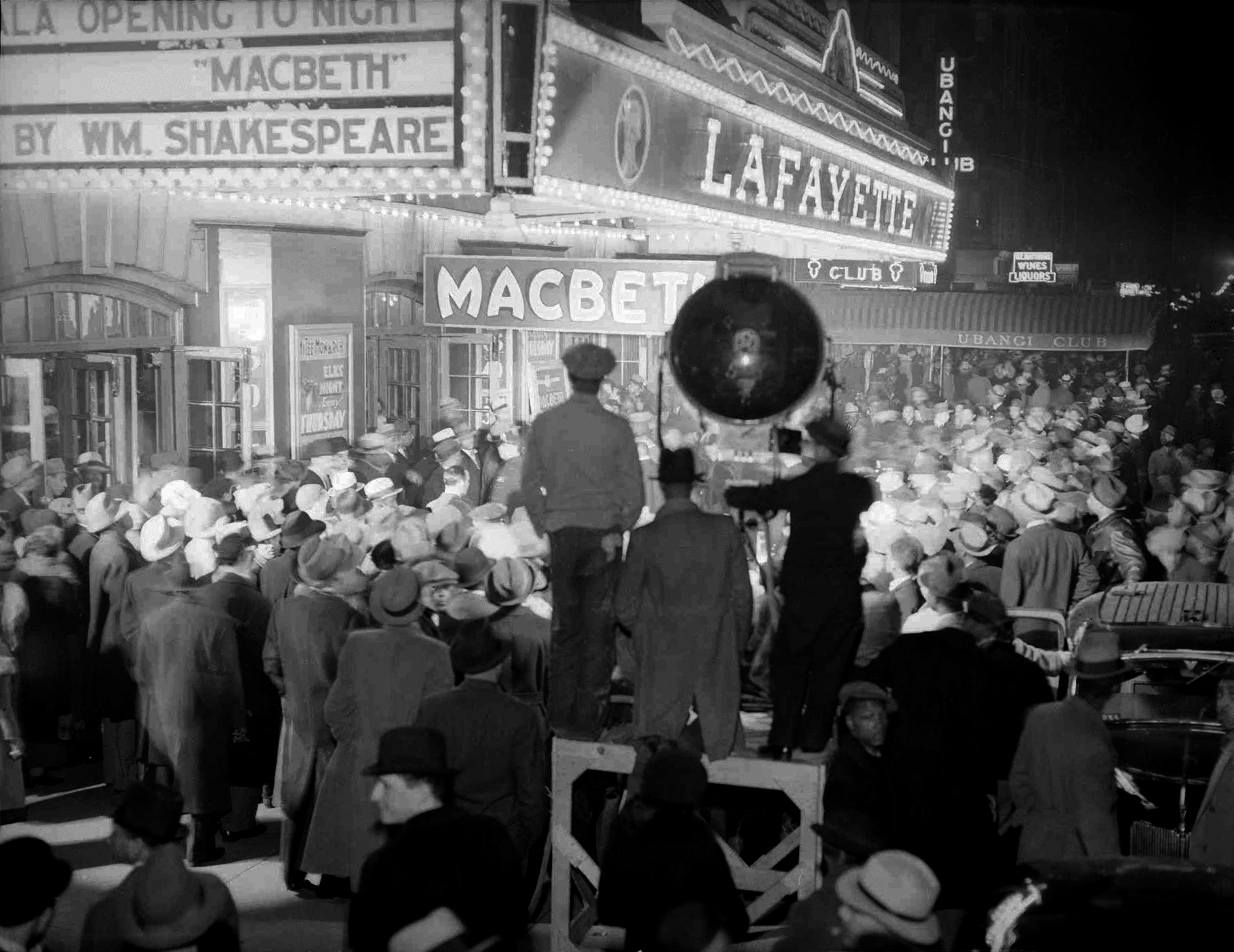
Lafayette Theatre (Harlem) where Walton served as producer, manager and songwriter.

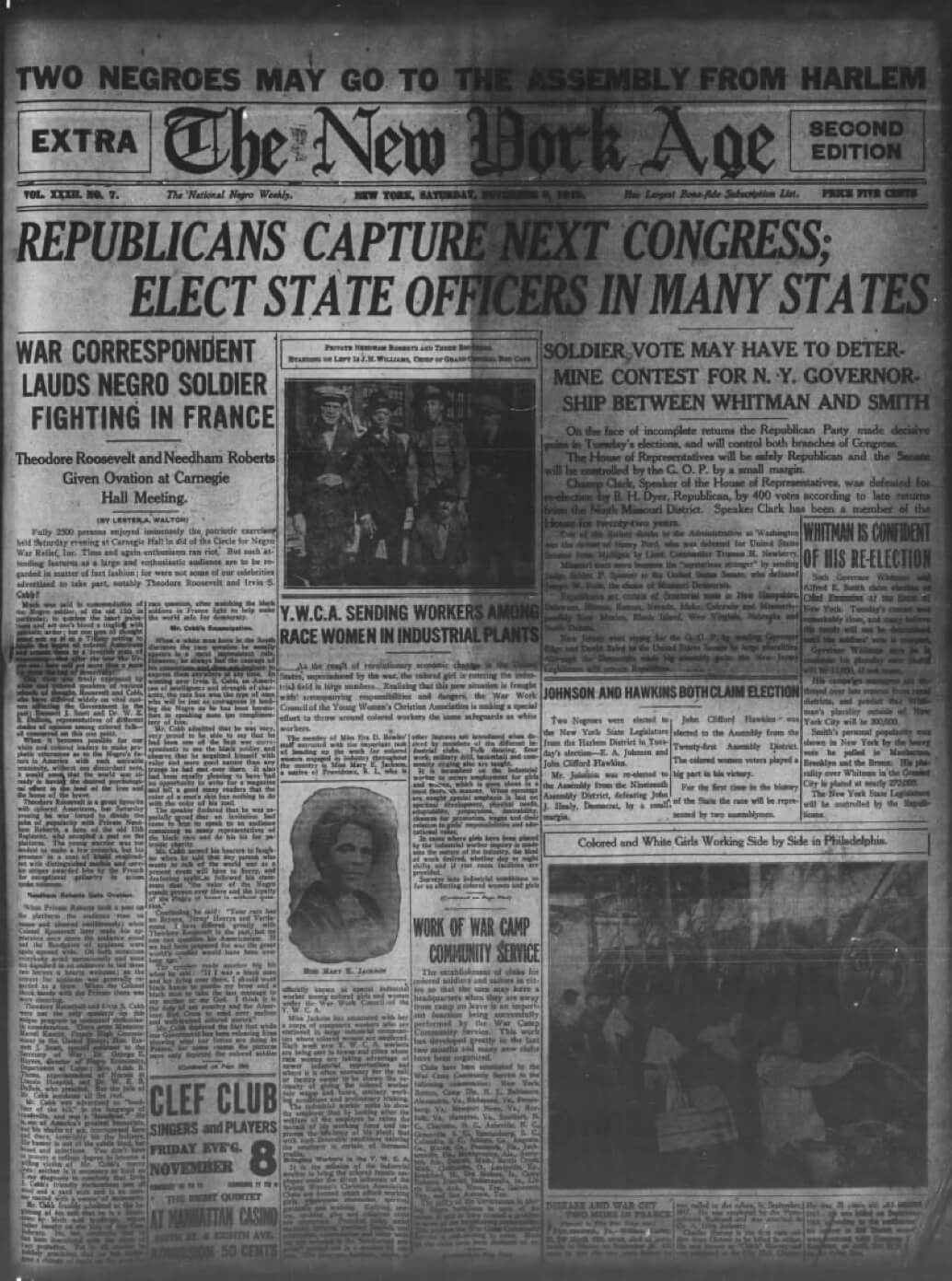
The New York Age where Walton served as both writer and editor. An article he wrote on "Negro" soldiers is on the upper left, date illegible.

A Broadway songwriter who wrote lyrics for Bert Williams and George Walker, Walton also produced his own theater productions, managed Harlem's Lafayette Theatre, including the Lafayette Players, and frequently collaborated on lyrics with the "legendary Ernest Hogan, a.k.a. the Unbleached American, an early black minstrel and vaudeville comedian who (by some historians’ reckoning) was the first African-American performer to play before a white audience on Broadway." “Black Bohemia” with Will Marion Cook and the protest song "Jim Crow Has Got to Go," popular during the early days of civil rights marches, are among Walton's better known compositions.

A seminal figure in early film criticism, Walton is considered to be among the earliest to understand the direct and indirect educational power of onscreen imagery. In his extensive writing on the medium, he produced numerous persuasive, wide-ranging and foundational arguments for condemning the objectification of Black Americans, and for understanding the resonance of the medium.

In an ultimately successful, and seemingly modern campaign, Walton, with help from the Associated Press, advocated for the media to capitalize the "N" in "Negro," and eliminate the use of the word "Negress" altogether. He went on to become an advocate of another kind when President Franklin Delano Roosevelt appointed him U.S. Ambassador to Liberia in 1935. During his decade-plus tenure there, he successfully concluded several important treaties, while also negotiating the terms of an American air base, and helping Liberia build a market for rubber exports.

Walton's contributions to the culture, discourse, and advancement of civil rights were recognized in his time with three honorary degrees: in 1927, he received a Master of Arts from Lincoln University in Chester, Pennsylvania. In 1945 and in 1958, he received an LL.D. from Wilberforce University in Ohio and the University of Liberia, respectively.

== Newspaper career ==
Hired at the St. Louis Star in 1902, Walton was one of the nation's first full-time Black reporters, as well as the paper's first Black full-time sportswriter. Charged with reporting on golf, he later served as the paper's court reporter.

Four of Walton's Musical Collaborators

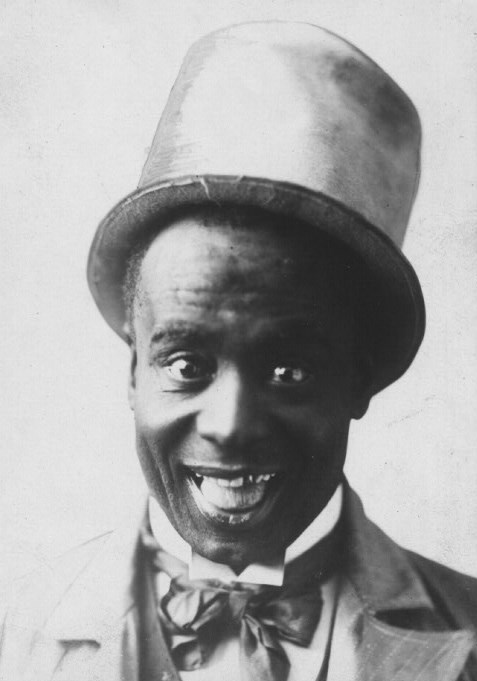
Ernest Hogan

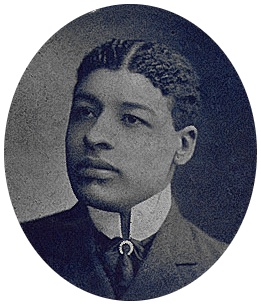
Bert Williams

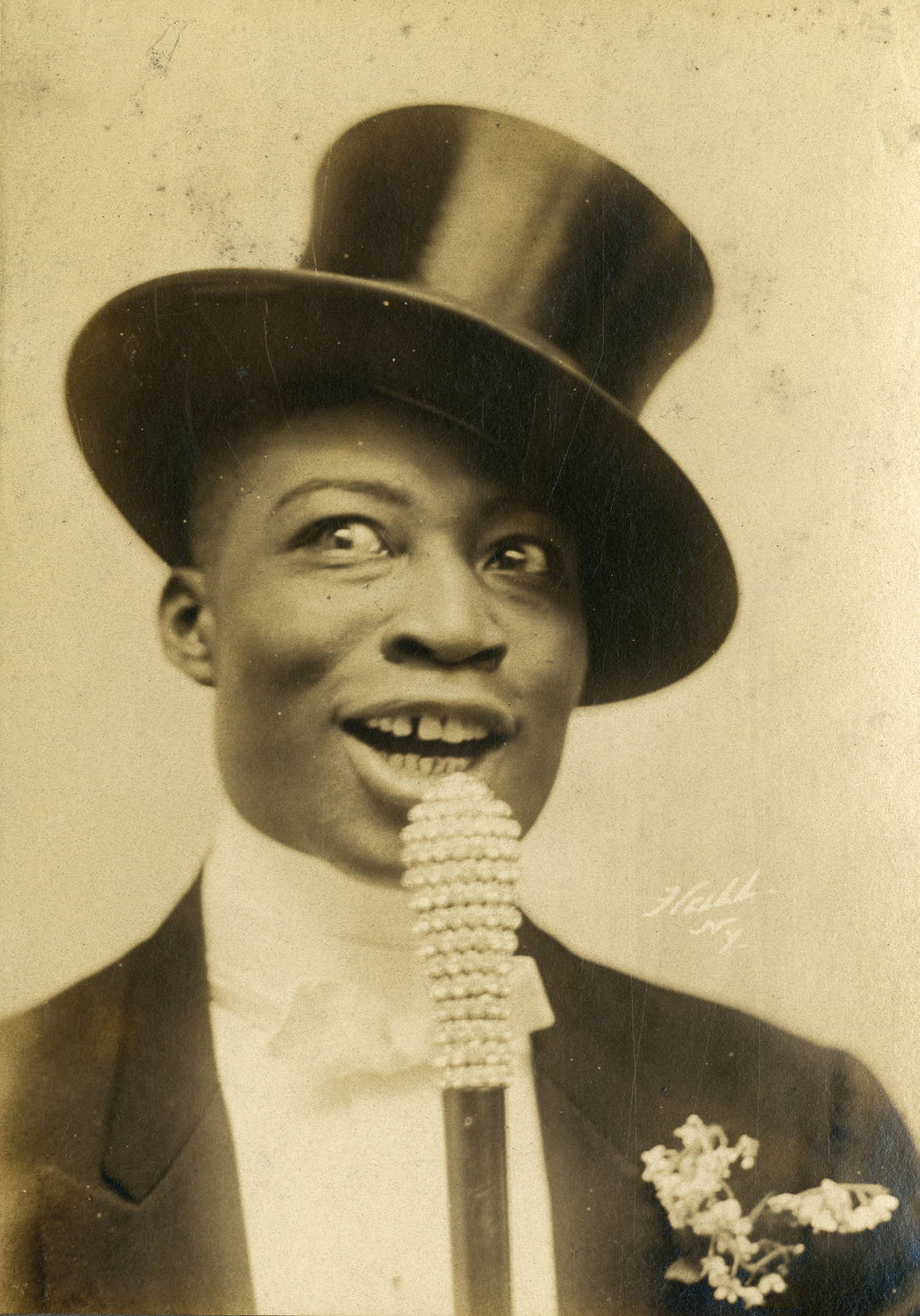
George Walker

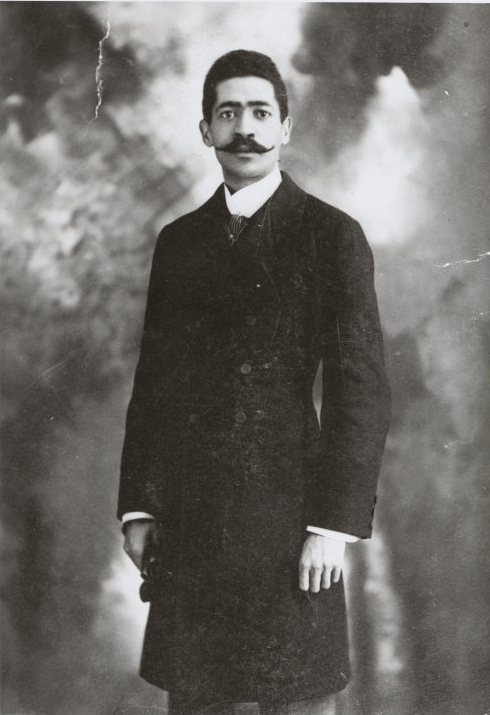
Will Marion Cook

By 1908, Walton was working for the nationally distributed New York Age, the most important mainstream Black newspaper of the era. Since only a handful of Black sportswriters wrote for national outlets at that time, this automatically put Walton in an unusually powerful position. The popularity of film among Black audiences also increased the odds of his reach. Over the next decade, Walton continued to write on both. In sports, his efforts resulted in "effectively scooping an entirely new genre of sports ... covering the nascent Black basketball scene in pre-1910 New York City," while also covering baseball and prizefighting. In film, Walton used his platform to take a moral stand against lynching imagery and the related objectification of Black bodies in the burgeoning film industry. In an oft-cited 1909 column called "The Degeneracy of the Moving Picture Theatre," he railed against the profiteering dehumanization that led to a prominently displayed sign on Sixth Avenue, advertising "JOHN SMITH of PARIS, TEXAS, BURNED at the STAKE. HEAR HIS MOANS and GROANS. PRICE ONE CENT!" Warning readers to expect more of the same: "if we do not start now to put an end to this insult," he foretold the gruesome imagery of The Birth of a Nation, which he later classified as political art. Noting that German operas had been reclassified "German propaganda," during the First World War, he argued that films like D.W. Griffith's 1915 Birth of a Nation were "Un-American propaganda."

To colored Americans the campaign against German opera is a trivial matter compared to the un-American propaganda which upholds such vicious screen presentations as 'The Birth of a Nation' and teaches the false doctrine of 'All white men on top and all black men down.' After all, aversion against German opera is a mere matter of sentiment; the anti-Negro propaganda strikes at the very roots of the fundamental principles of democracy.

More than a century later, Walton's writing still "represents a critical vanguard for subsequent African American film literature." Among his many important observations was the insight that film could play a transformative educational role, and could be used to "emancipate the white American from his peculiar ideas" about the black community in ways that were "hurtful to both races." In 1913, with the assistance from the Associated Press, Walton launched a movement for the universal spelling of the word Negro to begin with the capital "N". In a letter to The New York Times called "Appeal for the Negro: Lester A. Walton Asks the Dignity of an "N" for his Race," he argued against a lowercase "n" for Negro because its dictionary definition was "An African black." But, he argued:

There are millions of us who are not Africans, neither are we black; there are millions of us who are black but are not Africans... Why not refer to the term "Negro" as a race of people and not regarding the color of one's skin? Then the term would embrace blacks, mulattoes and those of mixed parentage: for there are millions who are of various shades of brown; there are millions who are mulattoes and near mulattoes, and there are thousands who are white as any Caucasian. To classify these people as black would be as improper as to classify whites as blacks.

At the end of his appeal, he also asks that the members of the Associated Press eliminate the use of the "obnoxious" word “negress,” which he considered "vulgar."

== Political and diplomatic work ==
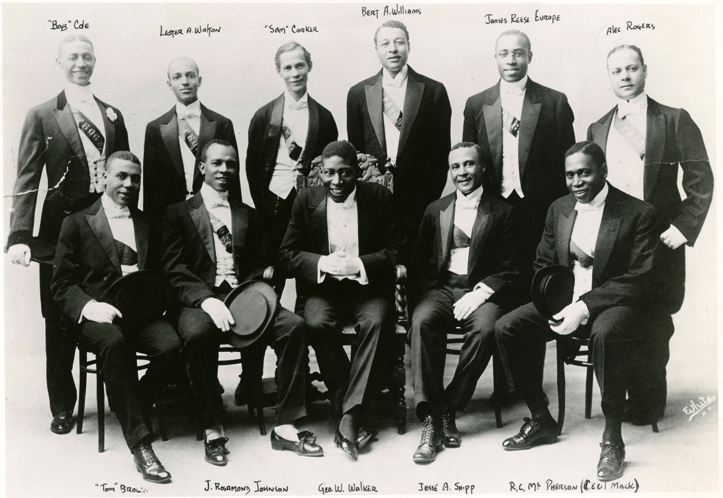
The Frogs club was a Black benevolent association, founded in 1908, for theater professionals. Walton is standing, second from left.

A burgeoning interest in world affairs spurred him to attend the Versailles Peace Conference as a correspondent in 1920. Soon after, Walton left the New York Age, and took a full-time position with the New York World from, only returning in 1932, with a promotion to associate editor. By then, he was also pursuing other interests, simultaneously serving as vice president of the Negro Actors Guild of America.

Walton was one of the first African Americans to work for the Democratic National Committee. Intermittently, from the mid-1920s to the early 1930s, Walton was an active democrat who served as director of publicity in the Colored Division of the Democratic National Committee. By the 1930s, he had become intrigued with Liberia. He visited the country in 1933, and published articles on the country for The New York Age and New York Herald Tribune. President Franklin D. Roosevelt nominated Walton as Envoy Extraordinary and Minister Plenipotentiary to Liberia in 1935, and he served as American Ambassador there until 1946. In 1942, in an article called "Balanced Budget and Voodoo," the New Yorker interviewed him. Although they described him as "interesting in his own right ... [and noted he was] one of the few Negroes ever to serve in the diplomatic corps," they spent much of the article mocking Liberia's lack of "modernization." Then populated by "repatriated American Negroes and their descendants," it was dependent on the U.S. for help with defense, produced few products outside rubber, and was best known for several native tribes that practiced "voodoo and human sacrifice." In its defense, Walton pointed out that it was "one of the few countries in the world that operate on a balanced budget." Despite the challenges, Walton "concluded significant treaties between the United States and Liberia, including the terms under which the American government established a United States Army base. Walton also negotiated with the Liberian government for the construction of a port in Monrovia and concluded commerce, navigation and aviation treaties."

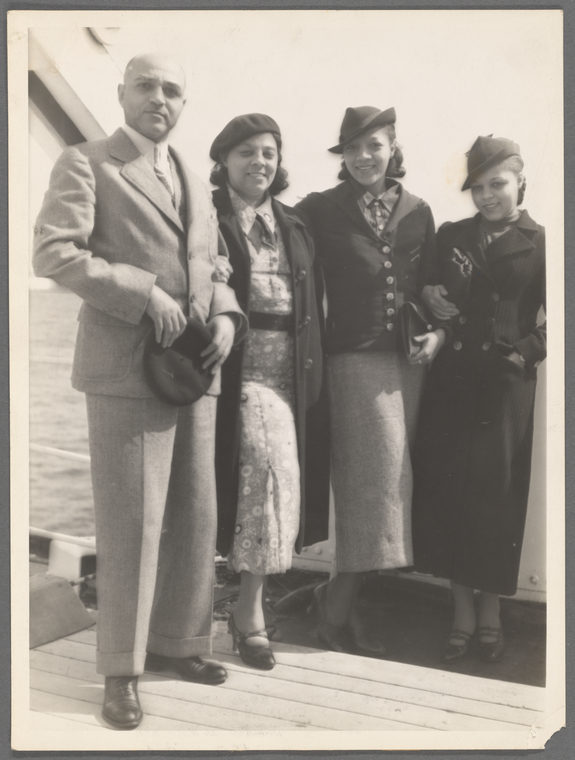
U.S. Ambassador to Liberia Lester Walton, en route to Liberia, with his wife Gladys, and daughters Marjorie and Gladys Odile in 1935.

Back in the U.S., he also served as advisor to the Liberian delegation to the United States from 1948 to 1949. In 1953, Walton founded the Coordinating Council of Colored Performers to advocate for three-dimensional, rather than stereotyped depictions of Black characters. "[S]hortly before he died," according to historian Susan Curtis, "an NBC executive sent him a telegram to thank him for everything he did."

A trusted confidante of NYC's three-term Mayor Robert Wagner, Walton worked extensively on issues related to housing and community relations in Harlem. Walton was also an original member of Mayor Wagner's Commission on Intergroup Relations, serving as commissioner who played a fundamental role in desegregating housing in the city." In the 1960s, the agency was renamed the NYC Commission on Human Rights.

== Personal ==
Born to Benjamin A. Walton, a public school custodian, and Ollie May (Camphor) Walton in St. Louis in 1882, Walton graduated from the then segregated Sumner High School in St. Louis. After graduation, his father provided him with a white tutor to help him pass an entrance exam in business school. Once matriculated, he joined the Alpha Phi Alpha fraternity, the first inter-collegiate Greek letter organization established for African Americans. On June 29, 1912, Walton married Gladys Moore, daughter of Fred A. Moore, publisher of the New York Age. They had two daughters together: Marjorie and Gladys Odile. In 1965, Walton died at age 84 in Harlem's Sydenham Hospital.

== Newspaper affiliations ==
=== Full-time ===
Sources:

- St. Louis Star
- The New York Age (1887–1960)
- New York World (1860–1931)

=== Contributing writer or freelancer ===
- The Afro-American Ledger
- St. Louis Globe-Democrat
- St. Louis Post-Dispatch

== Advocacy roles ==
- Colored Division of the Democratic National Committee — Director of Publicity
- Commission on Intergroup Relations (aka the NYC Commission on Human Rights) — Original Founder and Commissioner
- Coordinating Council for Negro Performers — Founder and Chairman
- Negro Actor's Guild of America — Vice President

== Professional associations ==
- Elks
- American Academy of Political and Social Science
- Alpha Phi Alpha
- The Frogs (an association for Black theater professionals)
- The Society of the Silurians

== Archives ==
- Rotten Tomatoes has a small selection of Lester Walton's film reviews
- The Lester Walton Papers are archived at the New York Public Library's Schomburg Center for Research in Black Culture, Manuscripts, Archives and Rare Books Division
- Lester Walton Photograph Collection at the New York Public Library
- Lester Walton Audio Collection at the New York Public Library
- Library of Congress's sheet music collection includes a half-dozen of Walton's contributions as lyricist or co-lyricist

Preceded by Charles E. Mitchell	U.S. Ambassador to Liberia; 1934–1946	Succeeded by Raphael Lanier
