= The Phrenologist Coon =

1901 song

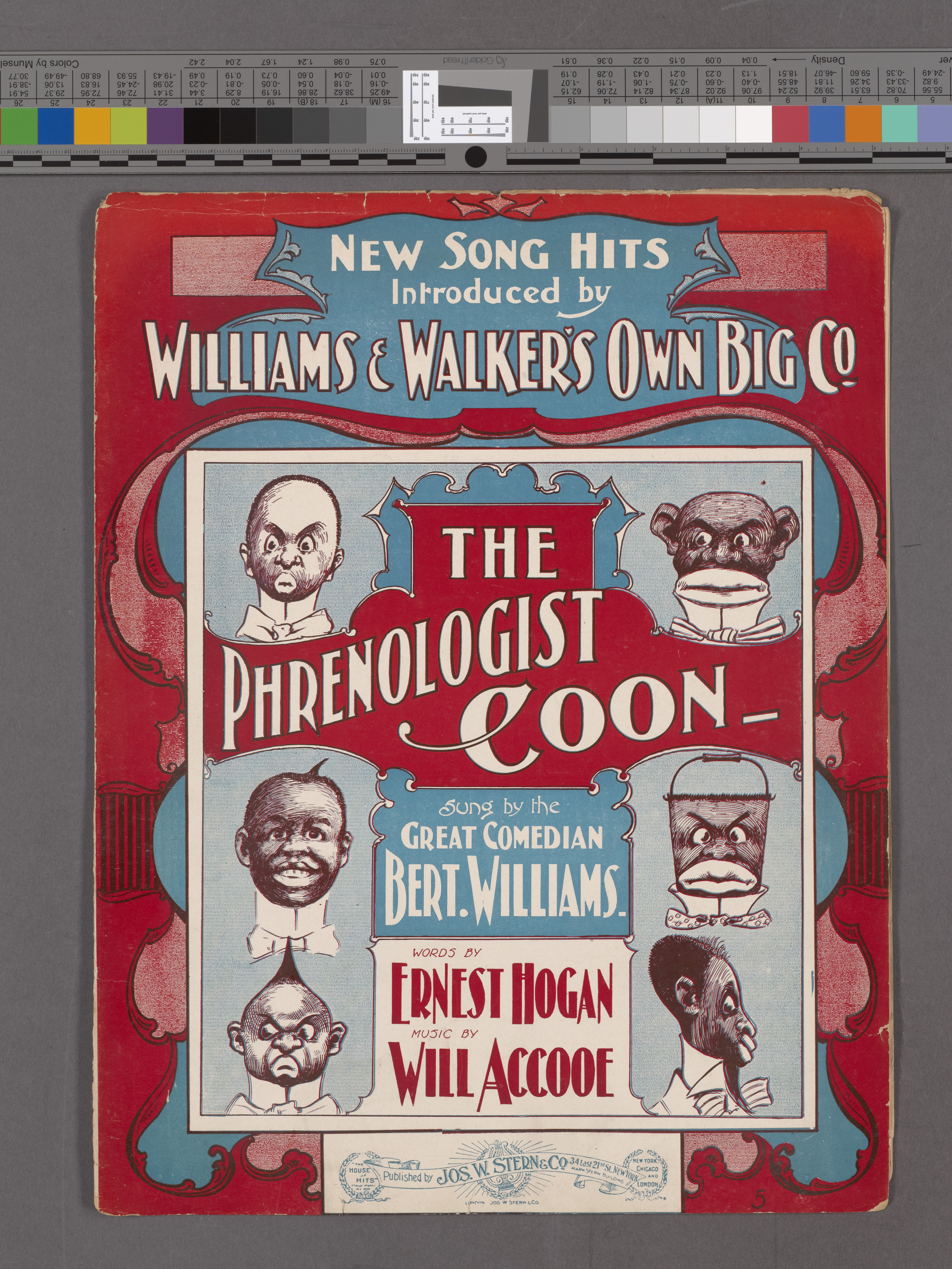

"The Phrenologist Coon" is a 1901 song written by African-American entertainer Ernest Hogan with music by Will Accooe. Bert Williams recorded it on Victor Records and sheet music was published for it. It was produced by Williams and Walker Co. and published by Jos. W. Stern & Co. in New York City.

The song's lyrics describe a "conjureman" ironically engaging in phrenology – the pseudoscientific study of human characteristics according to the shape of the skull. Paula J. Massood hypothesizes in Making a Promised Land: Harlem in Twentieth-Century Photography and Film (2013) that "In what is at first glance a demeaning stereotype, 'The Phrenologist's Coon' might, indeed, be something much more involved, because it suggests that black artists were self-consciously dialoging with political context prior to the modernist explorations of affirmative black identity by the Harlem Renaissance writers".

The tune as a schottische was used for the 1902 song "Maiden with the Dreamy Eyes" by Cole and Johnson.
