= Daisy Tapley =

American classical contralto and vaudeville performer

Daisy Tapley (1882–1925) was a classical singer (Contralto) and vaudeville performer. Born Daisy Robinson in Big Rapids, Michigan, she was raised in Chicago, where she played piano and the organ with music teachers Emil Liebling, Clarence Eddy, and later with Pedro Tinsley. At age twelve She became the featured organist at Chicago's Quinn Chapel as a musical prodigy. As a teenager, Robinson began training her voice after listening to recordings of the British contralto, Clara Butt. Daisy made history on December 7, 1910, when she became the first African American female to be recorded commercially, in a duet with Carroll Clark.

== Early life ==
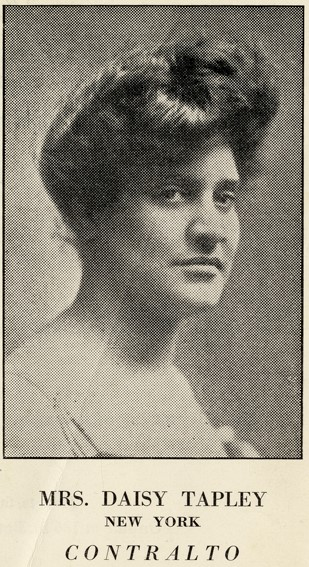
Tapley in 1915

In 1901 she married a Vaudeville musician named Henri Green Tapley, the couple did not have children. In 1903 they toured Britain with Bert Williams, one of the greatest comedians of the day and partner George Walker Company's In Dahomey, a production whose writers and cast were African-Americans. It was an elaborate play which performed at Buckingham Palace in London. It was also "the first full length musical written and played by blacks to be performed at a major Broadway house". The play contained original props, music and scenery. During the tour she met and connected with a soprano, Minnie Brown, whom became Daisy's lover, moving in with her back in Harlem as a domestic companion. While in Britain, Daisy performed in concert as a classical pianist and met with Samuel Coleridge-Taylor, a black British composer. She also met her musical idol, Clara Butt. They become fast friends and confidantes. Butt convinced Tapley to quit performing vaudeville and resume what she had trained for as a classical musician. She was persuaded by Butt's advice and on her return to Harlem set up a music studio in her apartment, establishing a lucrative music practice where she taught piano and gave voice lessons. Although the Tapley's marriage was never annulled, they had separate homes close to one-another in Harlem. Minnie Brown kept traveling and performed in Russia for a time, eventually returning to the US. In 1913, Jesse Shipp, the stage manager for the London performance of In Dahomey, produced and directed a performance of Gilbert and Sullivan's Mikado for the Howard Theatre in Washington, D.C. The production featured Daisy Tapley singing the role of Katisha. In 1922 she was performing in African-American plays and recitals at Carnegie Hall before mixed audiences.

== Activism ==
While she earned a living as a musician, she was also invested in social causes of the day. She had a prominent role in the 1917 Silent March similar to today's BLM peaceful demonstrations protesting African-American racial violence; the Dyer bill and the Anti-Lynching movement, she also participated in planning benefits and concerts which raised funds for 'race' causes. With the return of 'the Gallant Fifteenth' from the European theatre in 1919 Tapley was head of the soup kitchen at the Y 'Hut' in Harlem, which had over 200 beds for returning black servicemen. By the 1920s, she had gained recognition in New York's music venues as a celebrated songstress with an international reputation as a classical performer.

She associated with celebrated personalities including Samuel Coleridge-Taylor, Scott Joplin, Harry Burleigh W.E.B. DuBois, James Reese Europe, Alice Dunbar, Will Marion Cook, James Weldon Johnson, and Ada Overton Walker, the hoi-polloi of the early Harlem Renaissance. Her collaboration with Roland Hayes of Boston, a young Tenor Daisy discovered and promoted early in his career would prove lasting for both artists. Their collaboration in quartets and duets continued for two decades. This was during an era of Jim Crow when African-Americans were often subjected to negative conditions as performers and artists, which included racial violence from theatre owners and prejudice in lodgings and bookings. Many performers maintained high musical standards and personal dignity, as did Tapley throughout her life.

== Death ==
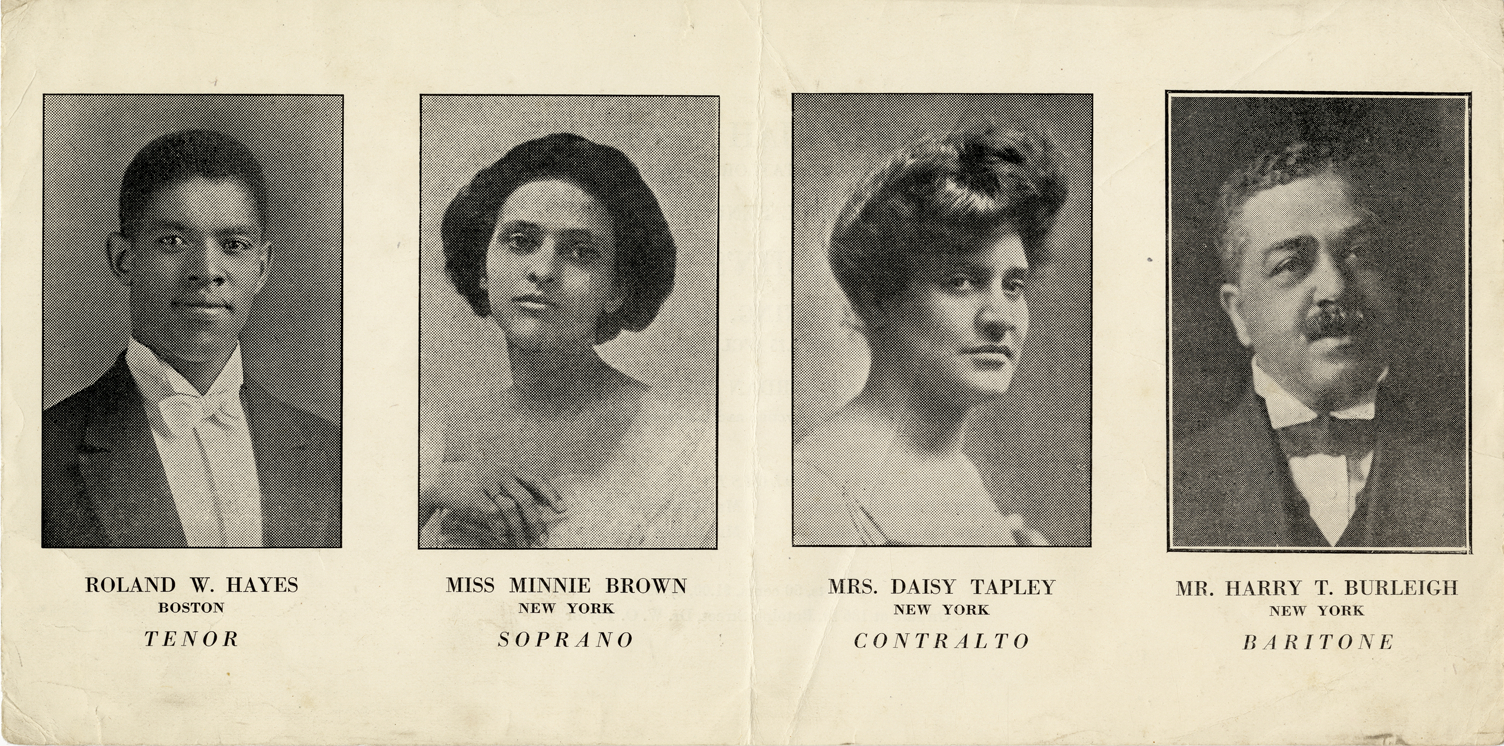
Photos of Hayes, Brown, Tapley & Burleigh (Photo courtesy Detroit Public Library)

She received test results in late summer of 1924 while rehearsing for an opera performance, indicating that she had ovarian cancer. Tapley died the following February and was interred in Oakland Cemetery where she spent summers at her home in Eastville.

== Discography ==
Audio Recording

I surrender all Tapley, Daisy, performing. Clark, Carroll, performing. Columbia A961. Matrix/Take: 19153/2. Contributor: Clark, Carroll – Van Deventer, Judson W. – Tapley, Daisy – Weeden, W. S. Date: 1910-12-07 (Source- Library of Congress)

== See also ==
- African-American musical theater
- Matilda Sissieretta Joyner Jones
