= The Frogs (club) =

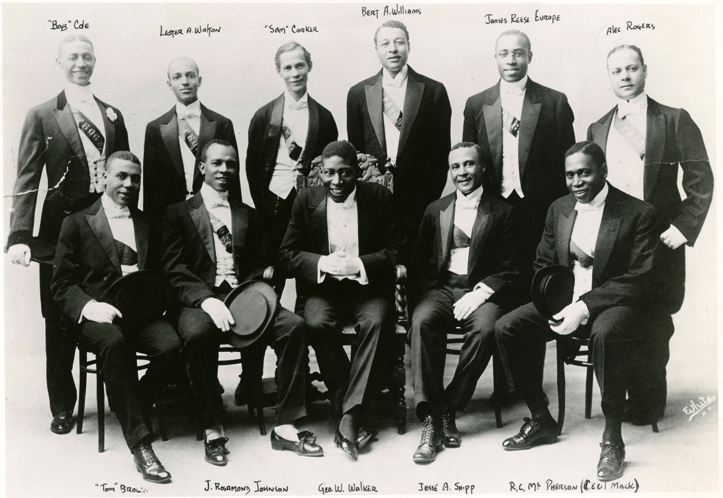
- The 11 founding members of the Frogs.
- Named after: Aesops Fables
- Predecessor: The Colored Vaudeville Benevolent Association
- Formation: 1908
- Founded at: 52 West 153rd Street, New York, New York
- Dissolved: 1920s
- Type: Benevolent Association
- Purpose: To create an all-Black professional support network in the theater arts and to establish an archival collection of theatrical material
- Headquarters: New York, New York
- President: George Walker

The Frogs was a charitable organization for African Americans modeled on The American Actors Beneficial Association. The Frogs' mission was to build a best-in-class professional organization for Black theater professionals and those in arts-driven professions that rivaled the American Actors Benevolent Association, which did not permit Black membership.

== The name ==
The name "The Frogs" originated from one of Aesop's fables and the comedy by Aristophanes entitled The Frogs. It was meant to symbolize the organization's noble goals for the Greater Black community.

== George Walker and The Frogs ==
For performers in the early 1900s, it was apparent that white management ran their shows with a firm grip, allowing for very little advancement of colored actors and performers. Although unions were often negatively perceived in labor professions, it was understood that such professional organizations could be seen as beneficial to performers, both Black and white.

Frogs founder, George Walker, wanted to build a fully funded, fully supported all-Black network, a functional counterpart to the white theatrical clubs and organizations that were forming during the early 1900s.

His original startup group, The Colored Vaudeville Benevolent Association, received negative reactions from white producers. The concept of the colored man supporting himself through performance and no longer just “taking what they were given” posed a threat to the white vaudevillian and theatrical community. The White Rats, a group of white actors and performers who started a performers club in the same vision as Walker, heavily oppressed the Black community in terms of equality for white productions versus African American productions — and spurred Walker to create the Frogs

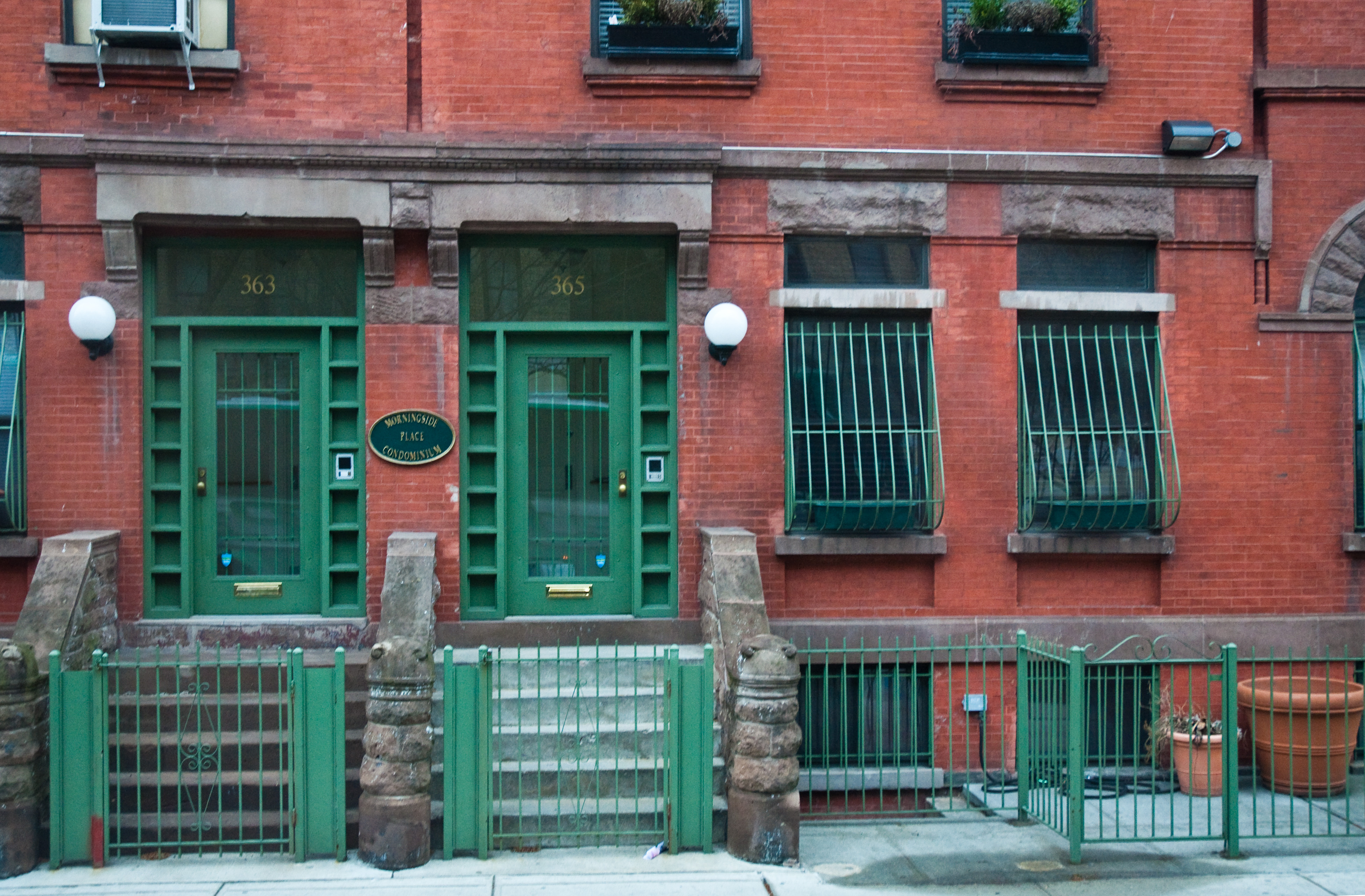
Harlem, New York

On July 18, 1908, at Walker's Harlem home at 52 West 153rd Street, eleven of the most prominent names in the industry established the African American theatrical organization. They held official elections for the positions of president, vice president, secretary and treasurer, as well as established plans to better the professional standings of the African American man. The Frogs remained a professional club for quite some time, including lawyers and doctors in their mix of members.

== Influence ==
Several years into the establishment of The Frogs, they became known for their big event “The Frolic of the Frogs” or “The Frogs Frolic” every August at the Manhattan Casino at 155th Street and Eighth Avenue. For 50 cents, people enjoyed a combination ball, party and vaudeville show where favors were given to the ladies and door prizes went to the three people wearing the most unusual costumes symbolic of the frogs. With great success in the early years of the event, “The Frolic of the Frogs” was able to tour their event in cities such as Philadelphia, Richmond, Baltimore and Washington D.C. Popularity in the frolic was found among both Blacks and whites.

In addition to “The Frolic of the Frogs,” The Frogs were known for their charity work, donating to several charitable organizations. They were also highly regarded and admired in Harlem, as well as other areas of the country. The organization's intention was to also establish an archival collection of theatrical material.

In the later years of The Frogs, a clubhouse for the organization was established in Harlem at 111 West 32nd Street. With a strong and variable professional reputation, the organization expanded its member base beyond the walls of actors and performers, bringing in members from professional and business backgrounds, continuing to prosper in the success of establishing a highly regarded organization for colored men.

In 1910, Bert Williams stepped up as the second president of The Frogs, with the anticipation of Walker's passing in 1911. With the success of the organization in its early years, the organization continued to flourish well into the 1920s.

== Founding members ==
- George Walker (original founder, President)
- J. Rosamond Johnson (original Vice President, professional composer)
- Jesse Shipp (original Treasurer, professional performer and librettist)
- R.C. McPherson or “Cecil Mack” (original Secretary, professional lyricist)
- Bert Williams (professional comedian and partner of George Walker)
- Bob Cole (professional singer, songwriter, and partner of J Rosamond Johnson)
- Lester A. Walton (professional critic and actor's agent)
- James Reese Europe (bandleader)
- Alex Rogers (professional lyricist)
- Tom Brown (professional dancer)
- Sam Corker Jr. (business manager and advance agent)
- Will (William) H. Dixon (The Original Dancing Conductor), Musician, bandleader, composer, singer/songwriter, playwright

== See also ==
- African American musical theater

== Bibliography ==
- "Bert Williams Jokebooks", Schomburg Center for Research in Black Culture, The New York Public Library
- Cullen, Frank; Hackman, Florence; McNeilly, Donald (2006). "Frogs Club". Vaudeville, Old and New: An Encyclopedia of Variety Performers in America. New York: Routledge. p. 421. ISBN 978-0-415-93853-2. OCLC 62430748.
- Jasen, David A.; Jones, Gene (1998). Spreadin' Rhythm Around: Black Popular Songwriters, 1880-1930. New York: Schirmer. ISBN 978-0-02-864742-5. OCLC 38216305.
- Smith, Eric Ledell (1992). Bert Williams: A Biography of the Pioneer Black Comedian. Jefferson, NC: McFarland. p. 106. ISBN 978-0-89950-695-1. OCLC 24910154.
- Sotiropoulos, Karen (2009). Staging Race: Black Performers in Turn of the Century America. Cambridge: Harvard University Press. pp. 202–205. doi:10.4159/9780674043879. ISBN 978-0-674-04387-9. OCLC 1241860450.
- Welcome to The Black Box, Personal Narratives in High Definition. Schomburg Center for Research in Black Culture
