= The Moon Shines on the Moonshine =

1920 song

The Moon Shines on the Moonshine is a song by Francis De Witt (lyrics) and Robert Hood Bowers (music). It was performed by Bert Williams in Ziegfeld Follies and recorded on an album. Shapiro Bernstein and Co. published sheet music for the song in 1920 in New York City.

Williams appears on the songsheet cover in blackface. The Library of Congress and New York Public Library have copies of it. Columbia Graphaphone Company released it on the B side of an album with the song "Somebody" by Williams. Paramount / New York Recording Laboratories also released it. Sidney Phillips recorded it on Victor Records.

In 1919, Williams also performed Irving Berlin's "You Cannot Make Your Shimmy Shake on Tea", and the Follies that year included other prohibition and alcohol imbibing related songs.

== Legacy ==
The song has been included in several compilations over the years. Robert Meijer curated a 2007 art exhibition using the song title as a theme.
