= A Natural Born Gambler =

- Bert Williams in A Natural Born Gambler (1916)
- Directed by: Bert Williams
- Written by: Bert Williams
- Starring: Bert Williams
- Cinematography: G. W. Bitzer
- Production company: Biograph Company
- Distributed by: General Film Company
- Release date: July 24, 1916
- Running time: 2 reels
- Country: United States
- Languages: Silent film (English intertitles)

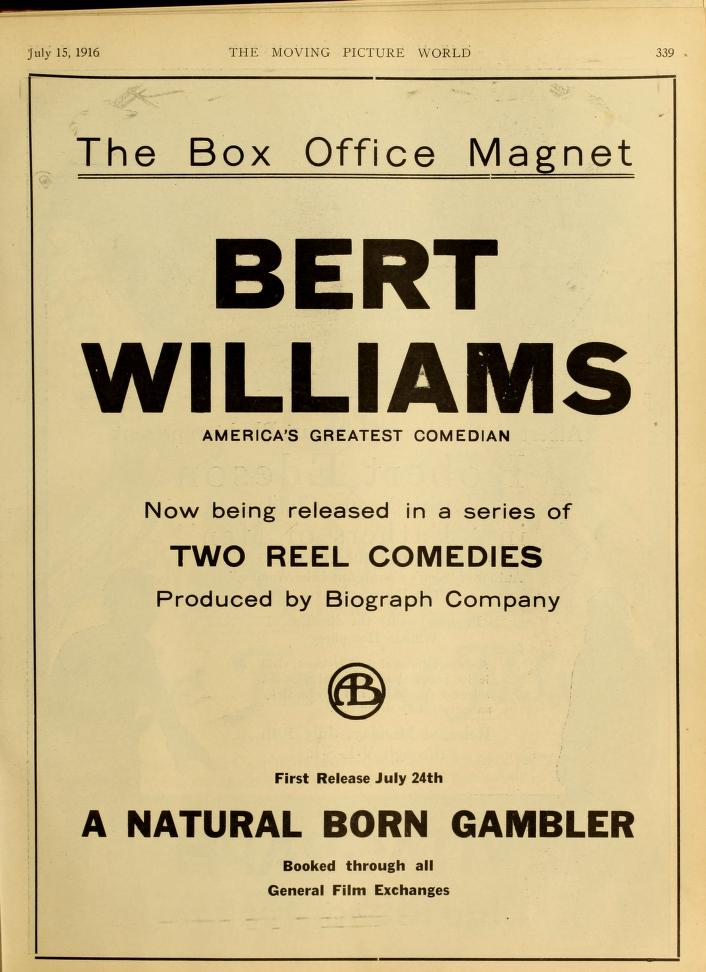
Advertisement for A Natural Born Gambler

A Natural Born Gambler is a 1916 silent film short, the first of only two films starring Broadway comic and singer Bert Williams. The film was Williams' first two-reel comedy, and was a film that was expected not to disappoint audiences and was highly anticipated. It was produced by the Biograph Company and released by The General Film Company. Williams directed and G. W. Bitzer, also known as Billy Bitzer, who was usually D. W. Griffith's cameraman, was the cinematographer. This is a still-surviving film, featuring Williams in his famous blackface routine. It is an authentic comedic film for its time (1916) in which Williams is still humorous without heavily relying on the popular physical style of slapstick comedy. Special and strategic advertising along with the name Williams had created for himself made it possible for the film to get exposure throughout the country. Most of this exposure came from newspaper prints.

== Bert Williams ==
Film exhibitors were excited to have pre-release sales of the film, as Williams was very popular through film and as a comedian. Much of Williams' reputation stemmed from his background of being a great comedian; he began entertaining as a member of the theatrical group the Ziegfeld Follies, where he thrived as a star and brought much of this comedic influence as well as his experience on Broadway with him in through film. It was said that Williams was one of the few comedians at this time who had the ability to be as successful and humorous within his films as he was on stage. Much of this experience he took with him throughout his film career seen through the comedic success of A Natural Born Gambler. All of this called for great success when the film was released on July 24, 1916. With the achievement of the film post-release, exhibitors remained happy about the film as they were able to profit from it throughout the rest of that summer.

== Summary ==
The film's opening scene takes place in a saloon. There are several men in the saloon, both white and black. They are preparing for the meeting of The Independent Order of Calcimine Artists of America, which is hosted by Hostetter Johnson (who is also the Bookkeeper in the film). Bert Williams (who is played by Bert Williams himself) attends and actively participates in the meeting and heavy gambling. While gambling at the meeting, Bert is hesitant to give up the money he has lost. After the meeting and much argument, Bert Williams carries home his right hand man Limpy Jones, because Limpy has a broken leg. As they walk through a graveyard en route from the saloon, they spot two thieves whom they suspect to be the devil when they hear them speaking. Bert and Limpy run back to the Saloon, with Limpy returning first, then Bert bringing the thieves with him, as he saw them on the way back and became friendly with them. In the saloon they take the thieves' winnings, which happens to be chickens, and force the two thieves to leave. Bert then tries to win in a dice game to earn back the money he had lost prior in the meeting. Brother Scott, who was the leader of the group and was also against gambling, makes everyone involved in gambling leave the saloon, but takes the money left behind. When all the men return, a man named Cicero Sampson enters the saloon, who has just returned from the north with a large amount of earnings he won while gambling there. As the men are now back in the saloon, an interested Bert challenges the successful Cicero to a game. With the help of Limpy, Bert is able to beat Cicero, and wins all of Cicero's money he won while in the north. Shortly after, the police come into the saloon and arrest the men for gambling. The judge orders that all of the winnings from gambling in the saloon go to Brother Scott as a lawyer's fee. The judge gives Cicero three days to leave town and orders Bert to jail for ten days. While in jail, Bert imagines dealing hands of cards.

== Themes ==
- Within the film there are several stereotypes of blacks, such as stealing, mischief, cheating, and greed.
- Although Brother Scott is not a gambler in the film, he is very greedy and makes consistent financial gains, more so than Bert. With that said, although Bert is always trying to get the upper hand, he can never seem to be fully successful.
- Williams continued to use blackface within his own film, as a way to bring in and entertain the mainstream white audience, allowing the film to gain success. Blackface would allow even blacks to be hyper-racialized and be seen as more entertaining to whites. It was one of the few ways many black actors such as Williams were able to gain success.
- In the film Bert Williams uses heavy facial expression as well as pantomime, which were very iconic of his acting style, and were a part of his identity as an entertainer. This gives the film another form of Williams' own authenticity.

== Characters ==
- Limpy Jones
- Bert Williams played by Bert Williams
- Brother Scott
- Hostetter Johnson
- Cicero Sampson

== Cast ==
Bert Williams

== See also ==
- Lime Kiln Field Day (1913) film featuring Williams, produced by Biograph and Klaw and Erlanger
