= In My Merry Oldsmobile =

Song performed by Billy Murray

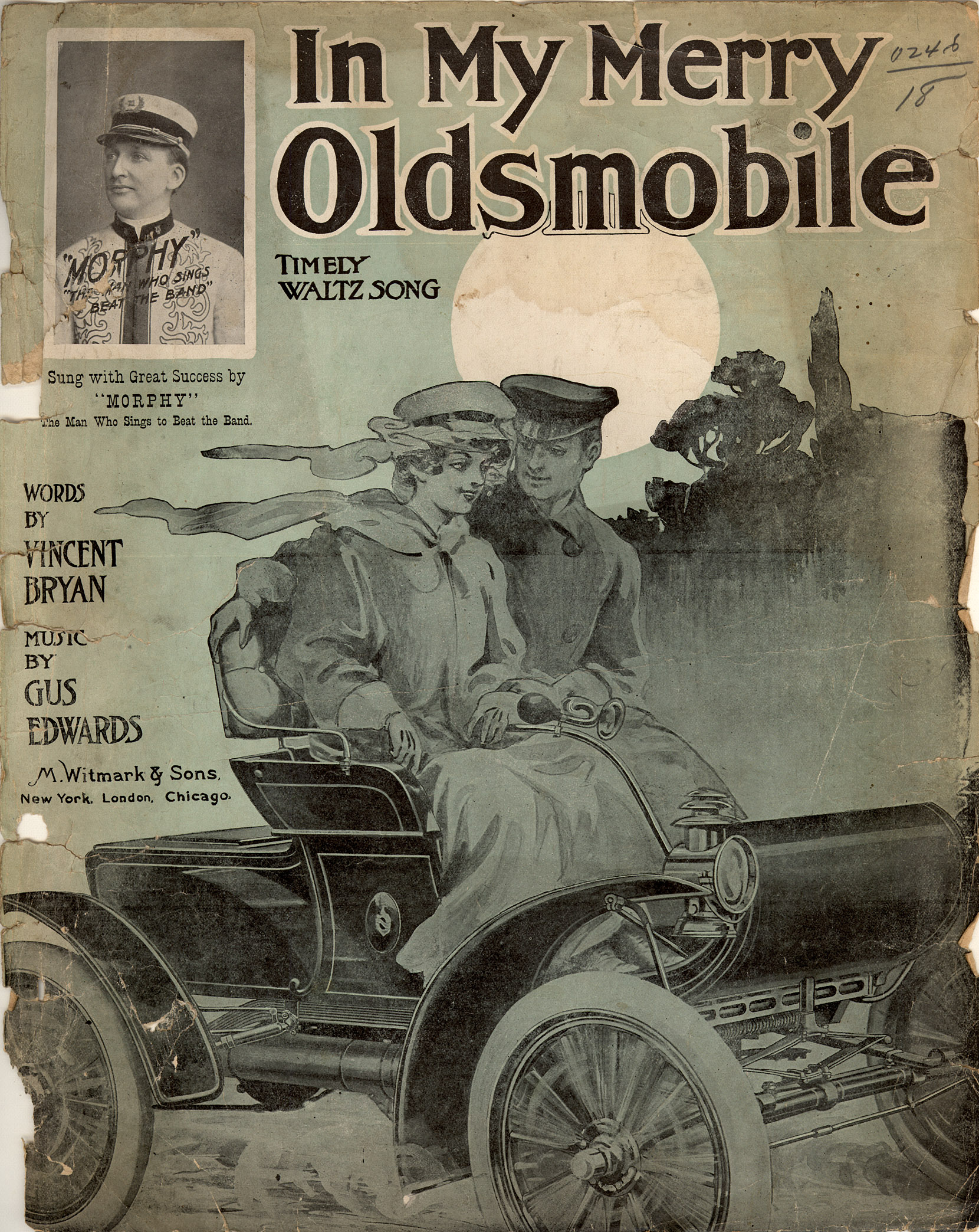
- In My Merry Oldsmobile songbook featuring an Oldsmobile Curved Dash automobile

Song
- Published: 1905 (119-120 Years Ago) by M. Witmark & Sons
- Composer: Gus Edwards
- Lyricist: Vincent P. Bryan

"In My Merry Oldsmobile" is a popular song from 1905, with music by Gus Edwards and lyrics by Vincent P. Bryan.

The song's chorus is one of the most enduring automobile-oriented songs. The verses, which are slightly suggestive (by 1905 standards), tell of a couple who court and fall in love during a trip with a new Oldsmobile.

== Popular culture ==
Oldsmobile Division of General Motors used the song, with altered lyrics, for several decades as a marketing jingle.

"In My Merry Oldsmobile" was used as the opening and closing themes for the 1927 Warner Bros. Pictures film The First Auto.

The song was featured in the 1931 Fleischer Studios animated short In My Merry Automobile as a "follow the bouncing ball" sing-along feature. The short, directed by Jimmy Culhane, was produced "by arrangement and in cooperation with" the Olds Motor Works.

Bing Crosby featured the song in his film The Star Maker in 1939 and recorded the song for Decca Records on June 30, 1939.

"In My Merry Oldsmobile" was often used by Carl Stalling, long-time music director for Warner Bros. Cartoons, especially when references to automobiles or driving were made.

"In My Merry Oldsmobile" is one of the songs played on Main Street USA in Disneyland and the Walt Disney World Magic Kingdom.

It was also sung in episode The Best Of Enemies of M*A*S*H by Hawkeye Pierce (played by Alan Alda) while driving a Jeep in Korea.

The song was also featured in the Broadway musical Tintypes.

"In My Merry Oldsmobile" is one of the songs sung by the BonziBuddy software application.

In the song "Lord, Mr. Ford" by Jerry Reed, he mentions the song.

Oldsmobile sponsored several TV shows starring Patti Page in the 1950s, including The Patti Page Show from 1955 to 1956, The Big Record from 1957 to 1958 and The Oldsmobile Show starring Patti Page from 1958 to 1959. "In My Merry Oldsmobile" was used as the theme song on every telecast, and Page often sang some form of it with new lyrics. On some of the programs, the musical commercial segments were performed by Bill Hayes and Florence Henderson.

It was used as the opening and closing theme on Techdirt's Podcast Episode 28: Is Car Ownership On The Way Out?

Sung by Billy Murray in 1909
