= Richard Aellen =

American author of novels and plays

Richard Aellen is an American author of novels and plays. In 2006, his Farmers of Men won the Stanley Drama Award. His most recent play, NOBODY, was performed at the Alabama Shakespeare Festival in Montgomery, Alabama, in 2008 and was read again there, in a revised version, in May 2009.

== Novels ==
Aellen is the author of five thrillers. Redeye (1988) is a thriller about two identical twins raised in different environments; one is responsible for the killing of CIA operatives, while the other helps the agency tracking him down. The book was well received by reviewers; Robert Masello, in The Washington Post, praised its "strong and compelling narrative drive" and said that Aellen could give Harold Robbins "a run for his money."

The topic of multiple personalities drives the plot of The Cain Conversion (1993), a plot device which Chris Petrakos, in the Chicago Tribune, called "good for keeping the reader off-balance and introducing an endless number of arcane plot twists."

== Drama ==
Aellen's Square One (1985), a one-act comedy, was performed at a festival of one-act comedies in the Intar Theater in New York City as part of the Manhattan Punch Line Festival but did not generate much excitement. More successful was his Farmers of Men, which won the 2006 Stanley Drama Award.

NOBODY premiered in 2008 at the Southern Writers' Project Festival of New Plays, presented by the Alabama Shakespeare Festival, to critical acclaim. Revised after comments by audience and critics, a reading of the play with the addition of music was restaged in 2009. The play examines racism in the United States of the early twentieth century, portraying Bert Williams and George Walker, two African-American vaudeville performers. The reading was praised by audience and critics.

== Bibliography ==
=== Novels ===
- No Sanctuary. New York: Random House. 1986. ISBN 9780553259261.
- Redeye. Donald I. Fine, 1988. ISBN 9780553282825.
- Crux: A Novel. New York: Donald I. Fine, 1989. ISBN 1-55611-135-5.
- Flashpoint. 1991. New York: Donald I. Fine. ISBN 1-55611-194-0.
- The Cain Conversion. New York: Donald I. Fine, 1993. ISBN 1-55611-348-X.

=== Drama ===
- Square One. 1985.
- Right to Remain Silent.
- Farmers of Men. 2006.
- NOBODY. 2006.
