= Tintypes =

Musical

- Original Cast Recording
- Music: arranged by: Mel Marvin
- Lyrics: Various
- Book: Mel Marvin; Gary Pearle
- Productions: 1979 Washington; 1980 Broadway

Tintypes is a musical revue conceived by Mary Kyte with Mel Marvin and Gary Pearle. The score, featuring works by George M. Cohan, John Philip Sousa, Joseph E. Howard, Scott Joplin, and Victor Herbert, among others, is a blend of the patriotic songs, romantic tunes, and ragtime popular during the era between 1897 and 1914. The show features five actors representing various historical characters of the period, including Emma Goldman, Theodore Roosevelt, and Anna Held.

The revue originally was produced by the Arena Stage in Washington, D.C. An off-Broadway production opened on April 17, 1980 at the York Theatre, where it ran for 137 performances. After eleven previews, the Broadway production, directed by Pearle and choreographed by Kyte, opened on October 23, 1980 at the John Golden Theatre, where it ran for 93 performances.

An original cast recording was released by DRG, and the play was staged for television in 1982 with the original principals.

== Cast ==
- Carolyn Mignini
- Lynne Thigpen
- Trey Wilson
- Mary Catherine Wright
- Jerry Zaks

== Songs ==
Act I

- Ragtime Nightingale
- The Yankee Doodle Boy
- Ta-ra-ra Boom-de-ay
- I Don't Care
- Come Take a Trip in My Airship
- Kentucky Babe
- A Hot Time in the Old Town Tonight
- Stars and Stripes Forever
- Electricity
- El Capitan
- Pastime Rag
- Meet Me in St. Louis
- Solace
- Waltz Me Around Again Willie
- Wabash Cannonball
- In My Merry Oldsmobile
- Wayfaring Stranger
- Sometimes I Feel Like a Motherless Child
- Aye, Lye, Lyu Lye
- I'll Take You Home Again, Kathleen
- America the Beautiful
- Wait for the Wagon
- What It Takes to Make Me Love You, You've Got It
- The Maiden With the Dreamy Eyes
- If I Were on the Stage (Kiss Me Again)
- Shortnin' Bread
- Nobody
- Elite Syncopations
- I'm Goin' to Live Anyhow, 'Til I Die

Act II

- The Ragtime Dance
- I Want What I Want When I Want It
- It's Delightful to Be Married
- Fifty-Fifty
- American Beauty
- Then I'd Be Satisfied With Life
- Narcissus
- Jonah Man
- When It's All Goin' Out and Nothin' Comin' In
- We Shall Not Be Moved
- Hello! Ma Baby
- Teddy Da Roose
- A Bird in a Gilded Cage
- Won't You Come Home Bill Bailey
- She's Gettin' More Like the White Folks Every Day
- You're a Grand Old Flag
- The Yankee Doodle Boy (Reprise)
- Toyland
- Bethena
- Smiles

== Awards and nominations ==
=== Original Broadway production ===
Year	Award	Category	Nominee	Result
1980	Drama Desk Award	Outstanding Musical		Nominated
1980	Drama Desk Award	Outstanding Actor in a Musical	Jerry Zaks	Nominated
1980	Drama Desk Award	Outstanding Featured Actress in a Musical	Carolyn Mignini	Nominated
1980	Drama Desk Award	Outstanding Featured Actress in a Musical	Mary Catherine Wright	Nominated
1980	Drama Desk Award	Outstanding Director of a Musical	Gary Pearle	Nominated
1980	Drama Desk Award	Outstanding Choreography	Mary Kyte	Nominated
1981	Tony Award	Best Musical		Nominated
1981	Tony Award	Best Book of a Musical	Mel Marvin and Gary Pearle	Nominated
1981	Tony Award	Best Performance by a Featured Actress in a Musical	Lynne Thigpen	Nominated
