= Bert Williams =

American comedian and actor (1874–1922)

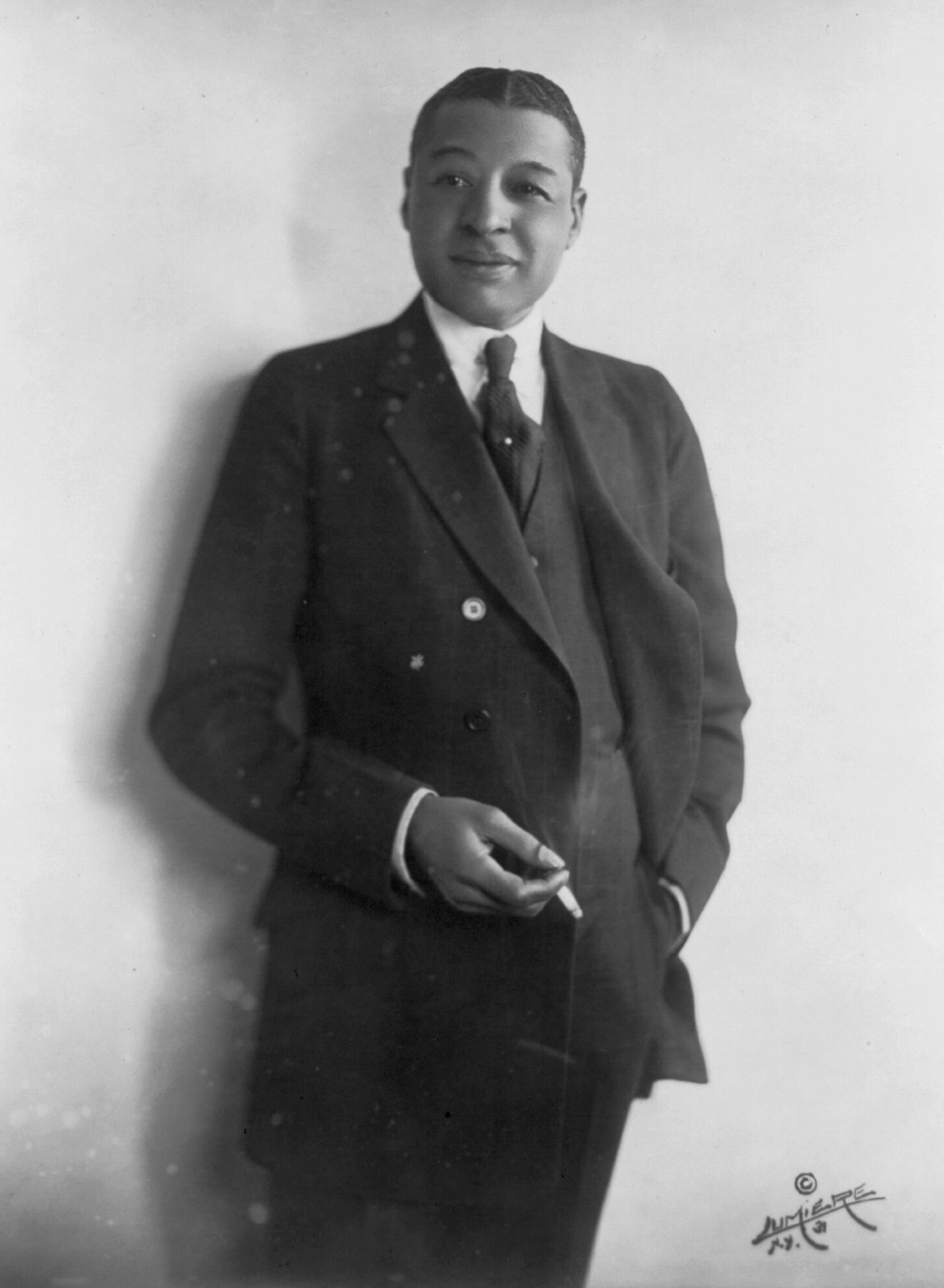
- Williams, c. 1921
- Born: Egbert Austin Williams; November 12, 1874; Nassau, Bahamas
- Died: March 4, 1922 (aged 47); New York City, U.S.
- Other name: Egbert Austin Williams
- Occupations: Entertainer, actor, comedian
- Years active: 1892–1922
- Spouse: Lottie Williams

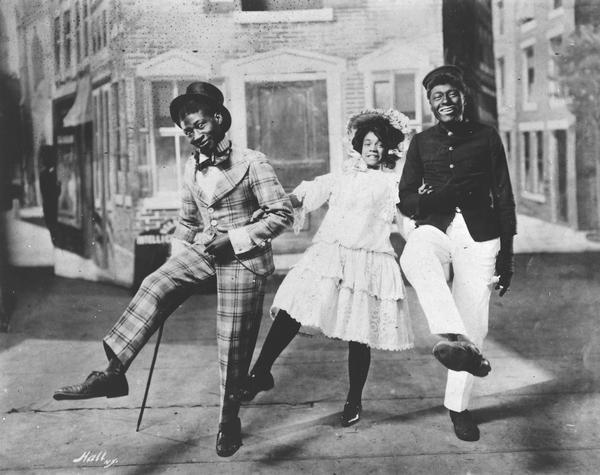
George Walker, Adah Overton Walker, and Bert Williams in In Dahomey (1903), the first Broadway musical to be written and performed by African Americans

Bert Williams (November 12, 1874 – March 4, 1922) was a Bahamian-born American entertainer, one of the pre-eminent entertainers of the vaudeville era and one of the most popular comedians for all audiences of his time. While some sources have credited him as being the first Black man to have a leading role in a film with Darktown Jubilee in 1914, other sources have credited actor Sam Lucas with this same distinction for a different 1914 film, the World Film Company's Uncle Tom's Cabin. Ebony stated that "Darktown Follies was the first attempt of an independent film company to star a black actor in a movie", and credited the work as beginning a period in independent American cinema that explored "black themes" within works made for African-American audiences by independent producers.

Williams was by far the best-selling Black recording artist before 1920. In 1918, the New York Dramatic Mirror called Williams "one of the great comedians of the world."

Williams was a key figure in the development of African-American entertainment. In an age when racial inequality and stereotyping were commonplace, he became the first Black person to take a lead role on the Broadway stage and did much to push back racial barriers during his three-decade-long career. Fellow vaudevillian W. C. Fields, who appeared in productions with Williams, described him as "the funniest man I ever saw—and the saddest man I ever knew."

== Early life ==
Williams was born in Nassau, Bahamas, on November 12, 1874, to Frederick Williams Jr. and his wife Julia. At the age of either two or three, Williams permanently emigrated with his parents to the US. Their names all appear in the 1880 United States Federal Census. They are shown as residents of New York City, and Bert (“Egbert”) is listed as five years old at the time. Having made his way to California by his late teens, he joined different West Coast minstrel shows, including Martin and Selig's Mastodon Minstrels in 1893 San Francisco, where he first met his future professional partner, George Walker.

Williams and Walker performed song-and-dance numbers, comic dialogues and skits and humorous songs. They fell into stereotypical vaudevillian roles: originally Williams portrayed a slick conniver, while Walker played the "dumb coon" victim of Williams's schemes. They discovered that they got a better reaction by switching roles and subverting expectations. The sharp-featured and slender Walker eventually developed a persona as a strutting dandy, while the stocky Williams played the languorous oaf. Despite his thickset physique, Williams was a master of body language and physical "stage business." A New York Times reviewer wrote: "He holds a face for minutes at a time, seemingly, and when he alters it, bring[s] a laugh by the least movement."

In late 1896, the pair were added to The Gold Bug, a struggling musical. The show did not survive, but Williams & Walker got good reviews and were able to secure higher profile bookings. They headlined the Koster and Bial's vaudeville house for 36 weeks in 1896–97, where their spirited version of the cakewalk helped popularize the dance. The pair performed in burnt-cork blackface, as was customary at the time, billing themselves as "Two Real Coons" to distinguish their act from the many white minstrels also performing in blackface. Williams also made his first recordings in 1896, but none is known to survive. They participated in a "Benefit for New York's Poor" held on February 9, 1897, at the Metropolitan Opera House, their only appearance at that theater.

While playing off the "coon" formula, Williams & Walker's act and demeanor subtly undermined it as well. Camille Forbes wrote, "They called into question the possible realness of blackface performers who only emphasized their artificiality by recourse to burnt cork; after all, Williams did not really need the burnt cork to be Black," despite his lighter skin complexion. He would pull on a wig full of kinky hair to help conceal his wavy hair. Terry Waldo noted the layered irony in their cakewalk routine, which presented them as mainstream Blacks performing a dance in a way that lampooned whites who had mocked a Black dance that originally satirized plantation whites' ostentatiously fussy mannerisms. The pair also made sure to present themselves as immaculately groomed and classily dressed in their publicity photos, which were used for advertising and on the covers of sheet music promoting their songs. Thus, they drew a contrast between their real-life comportment and the comical characters they portrayed onstage. This aspect of their act was ambiguous enough that some Black newspapers criticized the duo for failing to uplift the dignity of their race.

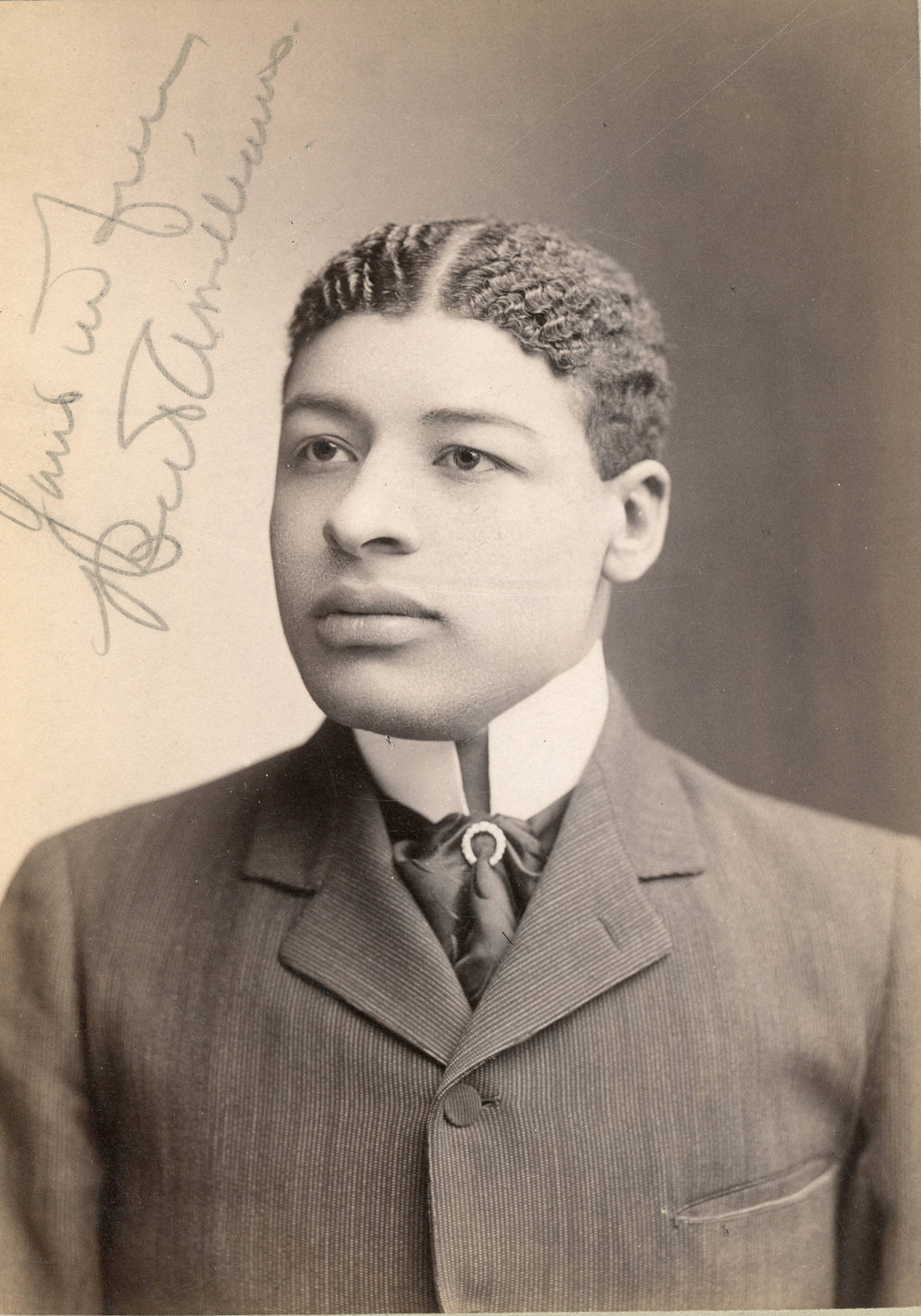
Bert Williams in 1902

In 1899, Williams surprised his partner George Walker and his family when he announced he had recently married Charlotte ("Lottie") Thompson, a singer with whom he had worked professionally, in a very private ceremony. Lottie was a widow eight years Bert's senior. Thus, the match seemed odd to some who knew the gregarious and constantly traveling Williams, but all who knew them considered them a uniquely happy couple, and the union lasted until his death. The Williamses never had children biologically, but they adopted and reared three of Lottie's nieces. They also frequently sheltered orphans and foster children in their homes.

Williams & Walker appeared in a succession of shows, including A Senegambian Carnival, A Lucky Coon, and The Policy Players. Their stars were on the ascent, but they still faced vivid reminders of the limits placed on them by white society. In August 1900, in New York City, hysterical rumors of a white detective having been shot by a Black man erupted into an uncontained riot. Unaware of the street violence, Williams & Walker left their theater after a performance and parted ways. Williams headed off in a fortunate direction, but Walker was yanked from a streetcar by a white mob and was beaten.

== Sons of Ham and In Dahomey ==
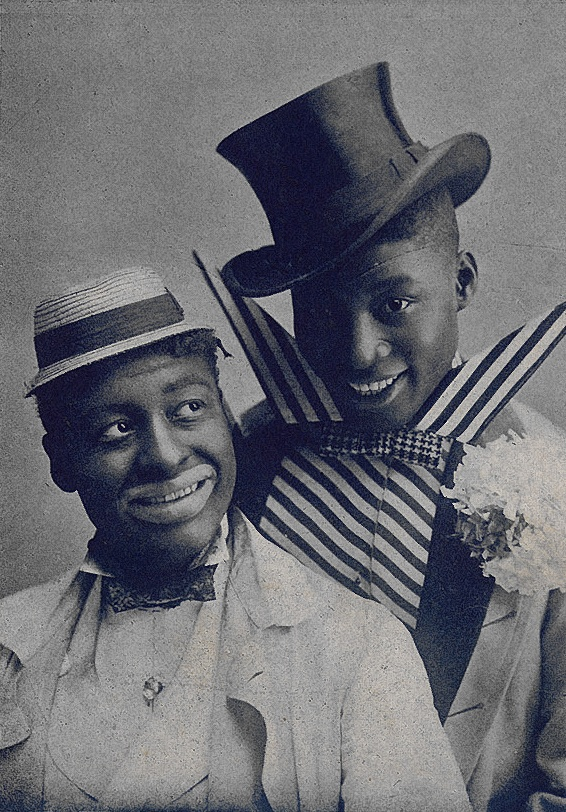
Williams (left) & Walker, on the 1903 cover to the sheet music for "I'm a Jonah Man" (from the musical In Dahomey)

The following month, Williams & Walker had their greatest success to date with Sons of Ham, a broad farce that did not include any of the extreme "darkie" stereotypes that were then common. One of the show's songs, "Miss Hannah from Savannah," even touched upon class divisions within the Black community. The pair had already begun to transition away from racial minstrel conventions to a fuller human style of comedy. In 1901, they recorded 13 discs for the Victor Talking Machine Company. Some of these, such as "The Phrenologist Coon", were standard blackface material, but the financial lament "When It's All Going Out and Nothing Coming In" was race-blind and became one of Williams's best-known songs. Another Williams composition, "Good Morning Carrie", was covered by many artists, becoming one of the biggest hits of 1901. These discs existed only in pressings of fewer than 1,000 and were not heard by many listeners. Sons of Ham ran for two years.

In September 1902, Williams & Walker debuted their next vehicle, In Dahomey, a full-length musical written, directed and performed by an all-Black cast. It was an even bigger hit. In 1903 the production, with music by composer Will Marion Cook, book by Shipp, and lyrics by poet Paul Laurence Dunbar, moved to New York City. Part of the inspiration for the show was Williams's copy of a 1670 book, Africa, in which author John Ogilby traced the history of the continent's tribes and peoples. "With this volume, I could prove that every Pullman porter is the descendant of a king," said Williams.

This show was a landmark event, as it was the first such musical to be produced at a major Broadway theater. Seating inside the theater was segregated. One of the musical's songs, "I'm a Jonah Man", helped codify Williams's hard-luck persona and tales of woe. It helped to establish the character which Williams played most frequently in his career: the slow-talking, deep-thinking victim of life's misfortunes. "Even if it rained soup," Williams later explained, "[my character] would be found with a fork in his hand and no spoon in sight." However, Williams and Walker were ebullient about their Broadway breakthrough, which came years after they had established themselves as profitable stage stars. Williams wrote, "We'd get near enough to hear the Broadway audiences applaud sometimes, but it was some one else they were applauding. I used to be tempted to beg for a $15 job in a chorus just for one week so as to be able to say I'd been on Broadway once." Walker recalled, "Some years ago we were doing a dance before an east side audience. They gave us a hand, and I called out to them, 'Some day we'll do this dance on Broadway!' Then they gave us the laugh. Just the same we gave Broadway that same dance."

In Dahomey traveled to London, where it was enthusiastically received. A command performance was given at Buckingham Palace in June 1903. The show's British tour continued through June 1904. In May, Williams and Walker were both initiated into the Edinburgh Lodge of the Freemasons; the Scottish Masons did not racially discriminate as the United States chapters did, including those of the northern states.|

== Abyssinia and recording success ==
The duo's international success established them as the most visible Black performers in the world. They hoped to parlay this renown into a new, more elaborate and costly stage production, to be shown in the top-flight theaters. Williams and Walker's management team balked at the expense of this project, then sued the pair to prevent them from securing outside investors or representation. Filings in the suit revealed that each member of the team had earned approximately $120,000 from 1902 to 1904, or $4.5 million apiece in 2025 dollars. The lawsuit was unsuccessful, and Williams and Walker accepted an offer from Hammerstein's Victoria Theatre, the premiere vaudeville house in New York. A white Southern monologist objected to the integrated bill, but the show went ahead with Williams and Walker and without the objector.

In February 1906, Abyssinia, with a score co-written by Williams, premiered at the Majestic Theater. The show, which included live camels, was another smash. Aspects of the production continued the duo's cagey steps toward greater creative pride and freedom for Black performers. The nation of Abyssinia (now Ethiopia) was the only African nation to remain sovereign during European colonization, repelling Italy's attempts at control in 1896. The show also included inklings of a love story, something that had never been tolerated in a Black stage production before. Walker played a Kansas tourist while his wife, Aida, portrayed an Abyssinian princess. A scene between the two of them, while comic, presented Walker as a nervous suitor.

While the show was praised, many white critics were uncomfortable or uncertain about its cast's ambitions. One critic declared that audiences "do not care to see their own ways copied when they can have the real thing better done by white people," while the New York Evening Post thought the score "is at times too elaborate for them and a return to the plantation melodies would be a great improvement upon the 'grand opera' type, for which they are not suited either by temperament or by education." The Chicago Tribune remarked, disapprovingly, "there is hardly a trace of negroism in the play." George Walker was unbowed, telling the Toledo Bee: "It's all rot, this slapstick bandanna handkerchief bladder in the face act, with which negro acting is associated. It ought to die out and we are trying to kill it." Though the flashier Walker rarely had qualms about opposing the racial prejudice and limitations of the day, the more introspective and brooding Williams internalized his feelings.

Williams committed many of Abyssinia's songs to disc and cylinder. One of them, "Nobody" (1905), became his signature theme, and the song he is best remembered for today. It is a doleful and ironic composition, replete with his dry observational wit, and is perfectly complemented by Williams's intimate, half-spoken singing style.

When life seems full of clouds and rain,
And I am filled with naught but pain,
Who soothes my thumping, bumping brain?
[pause] Nobody.
When winter comes with snow and sleet,
And me with hunger and cold feet,
Who says, "Here's two bits, go and eat"?
[pause] Nobody.
I ain't never done nothin' to Nobody.
I ain't never got nothin' from Nobody, no time.
And, until I get somethin' from somebody sometime,
I don't intend to do nothin' for Nobody, no time.

Williams became so identified with the song that he was obliged to sing it in almost every appearance for the rest of his life. He considered its success both blessing and curse: "Before I got through with 'Nobody,' I could have wished that both the author of the words and the assembler of the tune had been strangled or drowned ... 'Nobody' was a particularly hard song to replace." "Nobody" remained active in Columbia's sales catalogue into the 1930s, and the musicologist Tim Brooks estimates that it sold between 100,000 and 150,000 copies, a phenomenally high number for the era.

Williams's languorous, drawling delivery would become the primary selling point of several similarly structured Williams recordings, such as "Constantly" and "I'm Neutral". Williams even recorded two compositions entitled "Somebody" and "Everybody". His style was inimitable. In an era when the most popular songs were simultaneously promoted by several artists (for example, "Over There" was a top-10 hit for six different acts in 1917–18), Williams's repertoire was left comparatively untouched by competing singers. Describing his character's style and the appeal it had with audiences, he said: "When he talks to you it is as if he has a secret to confide that concerns just you two."

Williams and Walker were prominent success stories for the Black community, and they received both extensive press coverage and frequent admonitions to properly "represent the race." Leading Black newspapers mounted campaigns against demeaning stereotypes such as the word "coon." Williams & Walker were sympathetic, but also had their careers to consider, where they performed before many white audiences. The balancing act between their audience's expectations and their artistic impulses was tricky.

In his only known essay, Williams wrote:

People sometimes ask me if I would not give anything to be white. I answer ... most emphatically, "No." How do I know what I might be if I were a white man? I might be a sandhog, burrowing away and losing my health for $8 a day. I might be a streetcar conductor at $12 or $15 a week. There is many a white man less fortunate and less well-equipped than I am. In fact, I have never been able to discover that there was anything disgraceful in being a colored man. But I have often found it inconvenient—in America.

== Bandanna Land ==
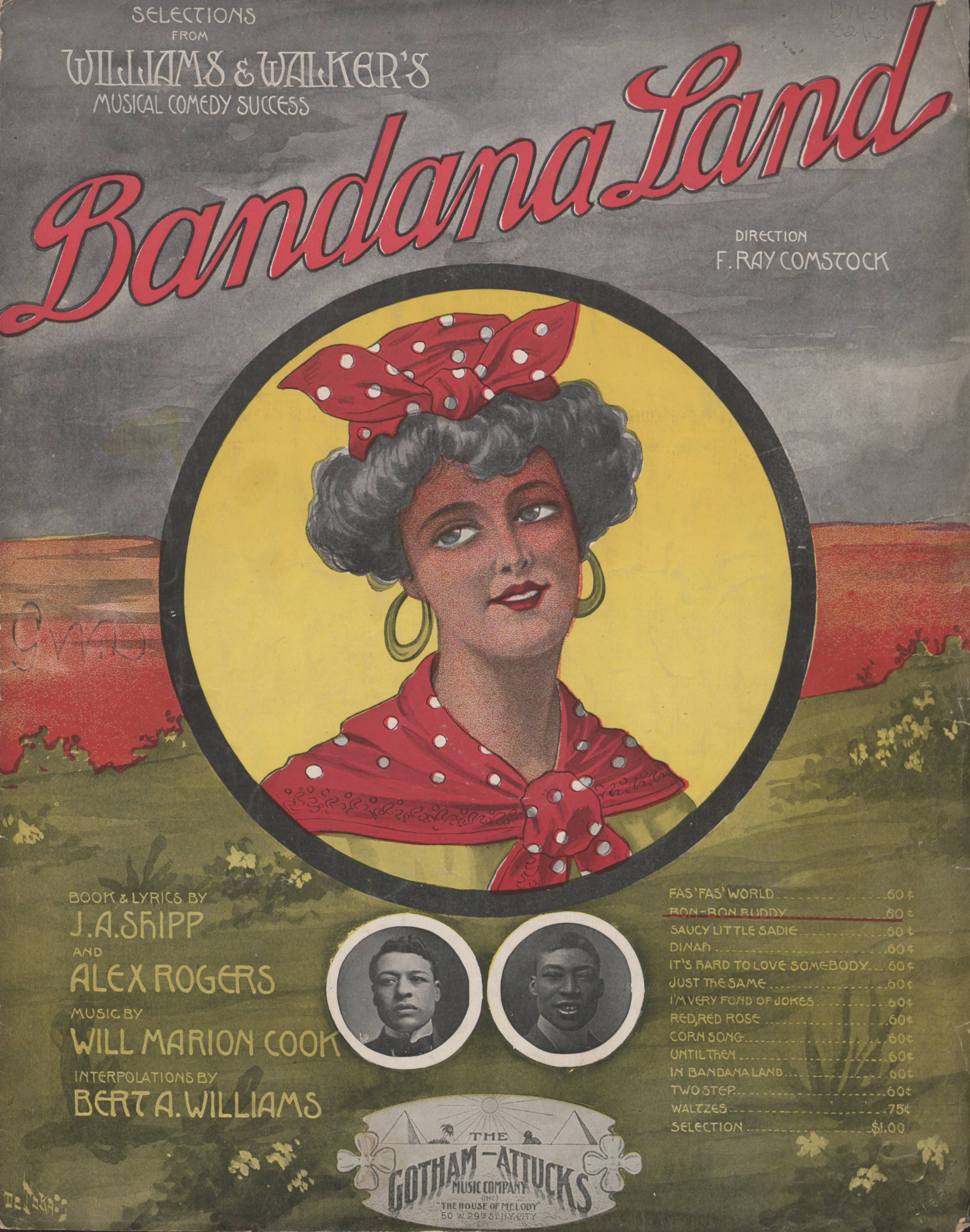
Bandanna Land

In 1908, while starring in the successful Broadway production Bandanna Land, Williams and Walker were asked to appear at a charity benefit by George M. Cohan. Walter C. Kelly, a prominent monologist, protested and encouraged the other acts to withdraw from the show rather than appear alongside Black performers; only two of the acts joined Kelly's boycott.

Bandanna Land continued the duo's series of hits and introduced a tour de force sketch that soon Williams made famous: his pantomime poker game. In total silence, Williams acted out a hand of poker, with only his facial expressions and body language conveying the dealer's up-and-down emotions as he considered his hand, reacted to the unseen actions of his invisible opponents, and weighed the pros and cons of raising or calling the bet. It later became a standard routine in his solo stage act, and was recorded on film by Biograph Studios in 1916.

== Solo career ==
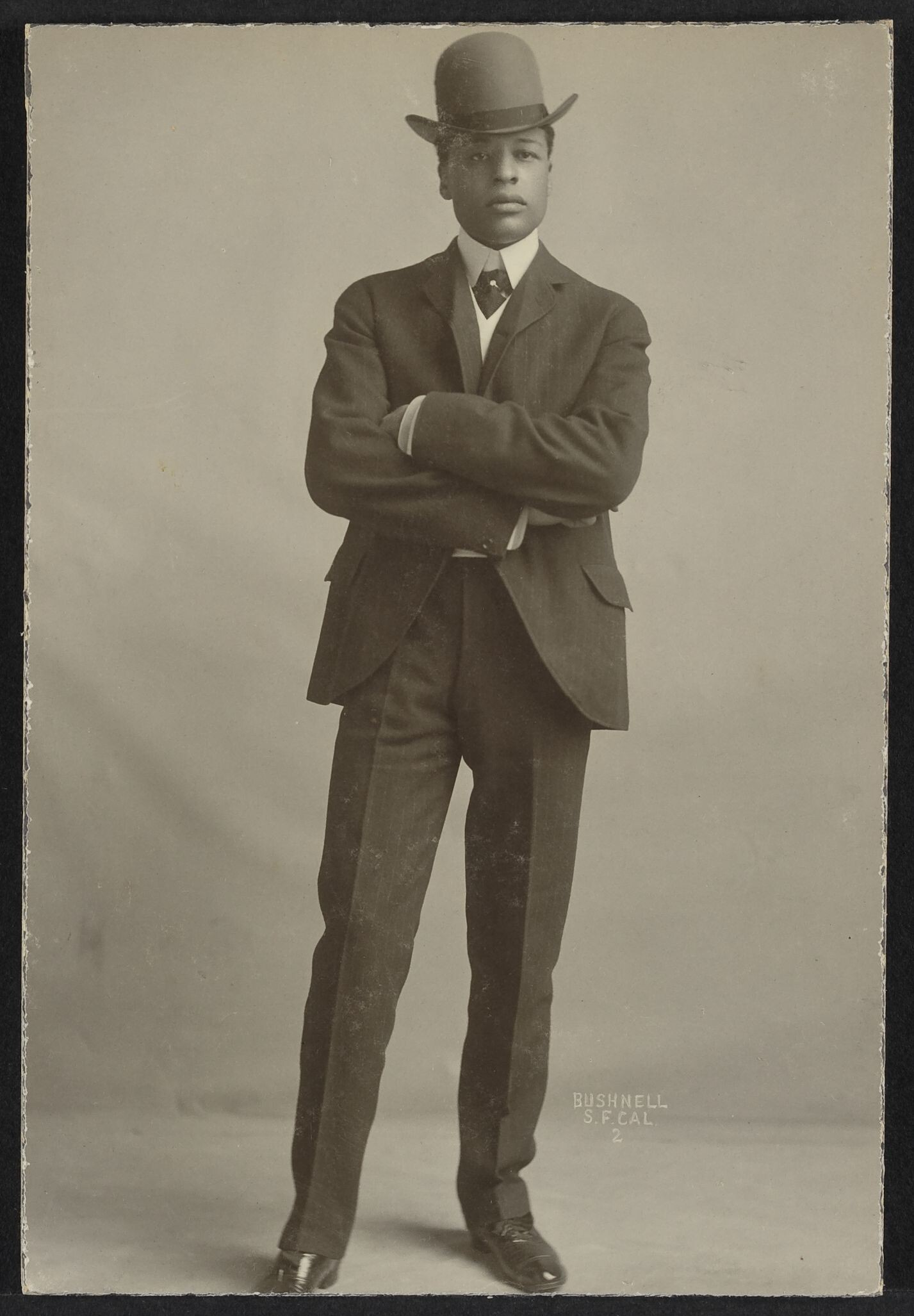
Bert Williams

Walker was in ill health by this point due to syphilis, which was then incurable. In January 1909, he suffered a stroke onstage while singing and was forced to drop out of Bandanna Land the following month. The famous pair never performed in public again, and Walker died less than two years later. Walker had been the businessman and public spokesman for the duo. His absence left Williams professionally adrift.

After sixteen years as half of a duo, Williams needed to reestablish himself as a solo act. In May 1909, he returned to Hammerstein's Victoria Theater and the high-class vaudeville circuit. His new act consisted of several songs, comic monologues in dialect, and a concluding dance. He received top billing and a high salary, but the White Rats of America, an organization of vaudevillians opposed to encroachments from Blacks and women, intimidated the theater managers into reducing Williams's billing. The brash Walker would have resisted such an insult to his star status, but the more reserved Williams did not protest. Allies were few; big-time vaudeville managers were fearful of attracting a disproportionate number of Black audience members and thus allowed only one Black act per bill. Due to his ethnicity, Williams typically was forced to travel, eat and lodge separately from the rest of his fellow performers, increasing his sense of isolation following the loss of Walker.

Williams next starred as Mr. Lode of Koal, a farce about a kidnapped king that was well received by critics as a star vehicle, although it did not have a fully realized storyline. Camille Forbes in Introducing Bert Williams collects several reviews that express competing race-based agendas. Many of the white reviewers praised Williams's "apparent spontaneous", "unpremeditated" humor, as if he were a guileless simpleton in no control of his own performance. A Chicago critic wrote, "They are racial, those hands and feet," while a Boston reviewer felt that the show's flimsiness and lack of structure were actually attributes because "when we succumb to the surreptitious desire for the broad tang of 'nigger' humor, we want no disturbing atom of intelligence busy-bodying about." Meanwhile, many Black reviewers ignored the show's faults, praising Williams's continued persistence and prominence as much if not more than his actual performance; an Indianapolis reviewer thought the play was evidence that "we are nearing the day of better things." Despite the good if loaded notices, Mr. Lode of Koal played a secondary string of theaters and was a box office flop.

Following the show's abbreviated run, Williams returned to the vaudeville circuit, and The White Rats renewed their opposition to his featured status. The Victoria Theater responded by cutting Williams to secondary billing, but putting his name on the marquee in lettering twice as large as that of the nominal headliner. Newspapers took note of the disingenuous manner in which the White Rats' demands had been met, as well as the way in which many of those performers who were impeding his career would rush to the front of the theater whenever his turn to perform came up.

== Ziegfeld Follies ==
After Mr. Lode skidded to a halt, Williams accepted an unprecedented offer to join Flo Ziegfeld's Follies. The idea of a Black-featured performer amid an otherwise all-white show was a shock in 1910. Williams's initial reception was cool, and several cast members delivered an ultimatum to Ziegfeld that Williams be fired. Ziegfeld held firm, saying, "I can replace every one of you, except [Williams]." The show's writers were slow to devise material for him to perform, forcing Williams to repeat much of his vaudeville act. But by the time the show finally debuted in June, Williams was a sensation. In addition to his usual material, Williams appeared in a boxing sketch playing off the racially charged "Great White Hope" heavyweight bout that had just taken place between Jack Johnson and James J. Jeffries. Reviews were uniformly positive for Williams, and also for Fanny Brice, who was making her Broadway debut.

Following his success, Williams signed an exclusive contract with Columbia Records, and recorded four of the show's songs. His elevated status was signaled not just by the generous terms of the contract, but by the tenor of Columbia's promotion, which dropped much of the previous "coon harmony"-type sales patter and began touting Williams's "inimitable art" and "direct appeal to the intelligence." Brooks wrote that "Williams had become a star who transcended race, to the extent that was possible in 1910." All four songs sold well, and one of them, "Play That Barbershop Chord", became a substantial hit.

Few stage performers were recording regularly in 1910, in some cases because their onstage styles did not translate to the limited technical media. But Williams's low-key natural delivery was ideal for discs of the time, and his personality was warm and funny.

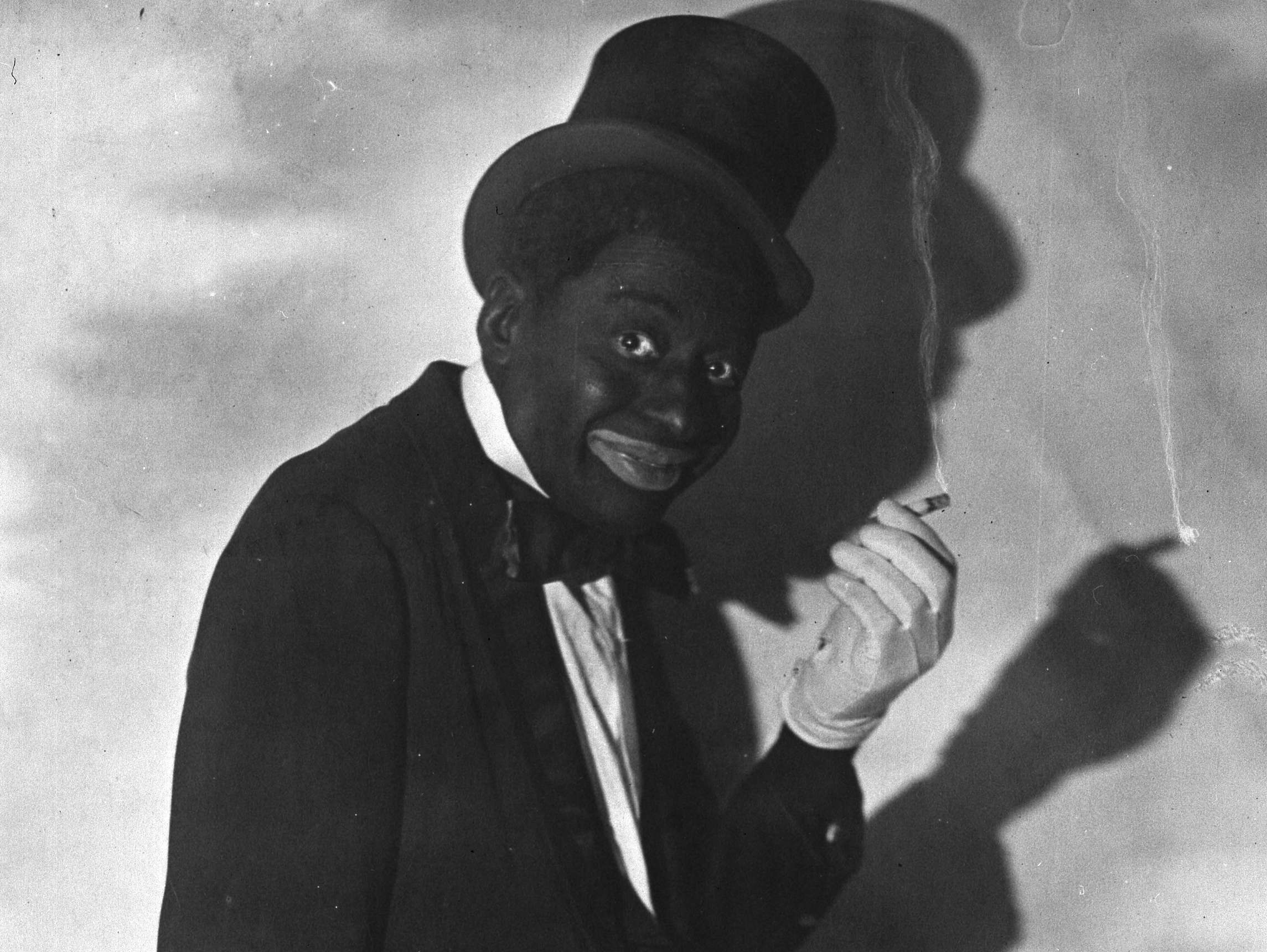
Bert Williams in blackface

Williams returned for the 1911 edition of the Ziegfeld Follies, teaming up in some sketches with the comedian Leon Errol to ecstatic effect. The best-received sketch featured Errol as a tourist, and Williams as a porter using a mountaineer's rope to lead him across dangerously high girders in the then-unfinished Grand Central Station. Errol's fast-talking persona and frenetic physical comedy gave Williams his first effective onstage foil since Walker's retirement. Williams and Errol wrote the sketch themselves, turning it into a 20-minute centerpiece of the show after the Follies writers had originally given Williams but a single two-word line of dialogue. Williams also reprised his poker routine and popularized a song called "Woodman, Spare That Tree".

The team of Williams with the white Leon Errol was a groundbreaking pairing that had never been seen before on the Broadway stage. Also notable was the relative equality of the duo in their sketches, with Williams delivering most of the punchlines and generally getting the better of Errol. At the conclusion of their Grand Central Station routine, Errol offered Williams a mere five-cent tip, to which the aggrieved Williams deliberately loosened Errol's supporting rope, sending him plunging from the high girder. Then, a construction explosion below sent Errol shooting into the sky, unseen by the audience, while Williams laconically described his trajectory: "There he goes. Now he's near the Metropolitan Tower. If he can only grab that little gold knob on top ... uh ... um ... he muffed it." After Williams's death a decade later, Errol was the only white pallbearer at his funeral.

Williams continued as the featured star of the Follies, signing a three-year contract that paid him an annual salary of $62,400, equivalent to $1.5 million today. By his third stint, Williams's status was such that he was allowed to be onstage at the same time as white women—-a significant concession in 1912—and started to interact with more of the show's principals.

In January 1913, he recorded several more sides for Columbia, including a new version of "Nobody"—the 1906 copies having long since become scarce. All of the releases remained in Columbia's catalog for years. He continued to make several more recording dates for Columbia, though he stopped writing his own songs by 1915. He also began making film appearances, though most have been lost. One of them, A Natural Born Gambler, shows his pantomime poker sketch, and is the best-known footage of Williams available. Part of an abandoned Williams comedy film, Lime Kiln Field Day, was found in the collection of the Museum of Modern Art and restored for its first screening in October 2014. The film featured an all-Black cast, and the recovered footage included cast and crew interactions between scenes.

Williams did not appear in the Ziegfeld Follies of 1913, instead taking part in an all-Black revue of The Frogs, a Negro theatrical organization that had been founded in 1908 by George Walker. For many of his Black fans, this was the first time to see Williams onstage since before he joined the Follies. Following the Frogs tour, Williams set out again on the vaudeville circuit, where he was the highest-paid Black performer in history.

Back in the Follies fold for 1914, Williams was reunited with Leon Errol for a more absurd version of their girder sketch, this time set on the 1,313th floor of a skyscraper. But as the annual production became more lavish, more crowded with talent, and more devoted to the parade of "Ziegfeld Girls," Williams and other performers were given less stage time, and less attention from the show's writers. This trend continued in the 1915 edition. W. C. Fields made his Follies debut in 1915 and endured the same treatment when the writers cut his scene down rather than enhancing it. Eventually, left alone on an empty stage with a pool table, the comedian responded by creating his famed "pool shark" routine. In 1916, the writers gave Williams a takeoff of Othello to play, but by most accounts neither the material nor his performance was up to his usual standard.

The 1917 installment of Ziegfeld's Follies featured a rich array of talent, including Williams, W. C. Fields, Fanny Brice, Will Rogers (who had debuted in 1916), and newcomer Eddie Cantor. Williams and Cantor did scenes together and struck up a close friendship. In 1918, Williams went on a hiatus from the Follies, citing the show's difficulty in providing him with quality parts and sketches. Within a month, he was performing in another Ziegfeld production, the secondary Midnight Frolic. By all accounts, Williams thrived in the smaller setting, in which he had the stage time he needed for his routines. He returned to the Follies of 1919, but once again was saddled with sub-par material, including a supporting part in a minstrel show segment.

Between 1918 and 1921, he recorded several records in the guise of "Elder Eatmore", an unscrupulous preacher, as well as songs dealing with Prohibition, such as "Everybody Wants a Key to My Cellar", "Save a Little Dram for Me", "Ten Little Bottles", and the smash hit, "The Moon Shines on the Moonshine". By this point, Williams's records were taking up a full page in Columbia's catalog, and they were among the strongest-selling songs of the age. At a time when 10,000 sales was considered a very successful major label release, Williams had four songs that shipped between 180,000 and 250,000 copies in 1920 alone. Williams, along with Al Jolson and Nora Bayes, was one of the three most highly paid recording artists in the world.

Despite continuous success, Williams's position was tenuous in other ways. When Actors Equity went on strike in August 1919, the entire Follies cast walked out, except for Williams, who showed up to work to find an empty theater; he had not been told about the strike. "I don't belong to either side," he told W. C. Fields. "Nobody wants me."

Williams continued to face institutional racism, but due to his success and popularity, he was in a better position to deal with it. On one occasion, when he attempted to buy a drink at the bar of New York's elegant Hotel Astor, the white bartender tried to chase Williams away by telling him that he would be charged $50. Williams's response was to produce a thick roll of hundred dollar bills out of his pocket; placing the wad on the bar, he ordered a round for everyone in the room. He told a reporter, "They say it is a matter of race prejudice. But if it were prejudice a baby would have it, and you will never find it in a baby ... I have notice that this 'race prejudice' is not to be found in people who are sure enough of their position to defy it." In a letter to a friend, Williams described some of the segregation and abuse he'd experienced, adding, "When ultimate changes come ... I wonder if the new human beings will believe such persons as I am writing you about actually lived?" Even so, in 1914, a perceptive critic for the Chicago Defender wrote: "Every time I see Mr. Bert Williams, the 'distinguished colored comedian', I wonder if he is not the patient repository of a secret sadness ... Sorrow concealed, 'like an oven stopped', must burn his heart to cinders."

== Late career and death ==
Williams's stage career lagged after his final Follies appearance in 1919. His name was enough to open a show, but they had shorter, less profitable runs. In December 1921, Under the Bamboo Tree opened, to middling results. Williams still got good reviews, but the show did not. Williams developed pneumonia, but did not want to miss performances, knowing that he was the only thing keeping an otherwise moribund musical alive at the box office. However, Williams also emotionally suffered from the racial politics of the era and did not feel fully accepted. He experienced almost chronic depression in his later years, coupled with alcoholism and insomnia.

On February 27, 1922, Williams collapsed during a performance in Detroit, Michigan, which the audience initially thought was a comic bit. Helped to his dressing room, Williams quipped: "That's a nice way to die. They was laughing when I made my last exit." He returned to New York, but his health worsened. He died at his home, 2309 Seventh Avenue in Manhattan, New York City, on March 4, 1922, at the age of 47.

Few knew he was sick, and news of his death came as a public shock. More than 5,000 fans filed past his casket, and thousands more were turned away. A private service was held at the Masonic Lodge in Manhattan, where Williams broke his last barrier. He was the first Black American to be so honored by the all-white Grand Lodge. When the Masons opened their doors for a public service, nearly 2,000 mourners of both races were admitted. Williams was buried in Woodlawn Cemetery in The Bronx, New York City.

== Legacy ==
In 1910, Booker T. Washington wrote of Williams: "He has done more for our race than I have. He has smiled his way into people's hearts; I have been obliged to fight my way." Gene Buck, who had discovered W. C. Fields in vaudeville and hired him for the Follies, wrote to a friend on the occasion of Fields's death: "Next to Bert Williams, Bill [Fields] was the greatest comic that ever lived."

Phil Harris recorded "Nobody" and "Woodman, Woodman, Spare That Tree"—both big hits of Williams—in late 1936 and early 1937.

Jelly Roll Morton recorded his own composition "Bert Williams" in his 1938 Library of Congress recordings made at the behest of Alan Lomax.

In 1940, Duke Ellington composed and recorded "A Portrait of Bert Williams", a subtly crafted tribute. In 1978, in a memorable turn on a Boston Pops TV special, Ben Vereen performed a tribute to Williams, complete with makeup and attire. He reprised Williams's high-kick dance steps, to such classic vaudeville standards as "Waitin' for the Robert E. Lee".

In World War II, the United States Liberty ship SS Bert Williams was named in his honor.

In the 1955 film The Seven Little Foys, a biography of vaudevillian Eddie Foy, Bob Hope sings "Nobody".

The 1975 musical version of Chicago, which reimagined the characters of the 1926 play Chicago with the personalities of famed vaudeville performers of the 1920s, adapted Williams's personality for the character of Amos Hart. Hart's featured number in the musical, "Mister Cellophane," is a pastiche of "Nobody."

Ry Cooder covered Williams's song "Nobody" on his album Jazz, released in 1978.

The 1980 Broadway musical Tintypes featured "Nobody" and "I'm a Jonah Man", a song first popularized by Williams in 1903.

Johnny Cash covered Williams's song "Nobody" on his album American III: Solitary Man, released in 2000.

In 1996, Bert Williams was inducted into the International Clown Hall of Fame.

The Archeophone label has collected and released all of Williams's extant recordings on three CDs.

Dancing in the Dark (2005) by Caryl Phillips is a novelization of the life of Bert Williams.

Nobody (2008) by Richard Aellen is a play centered on Williams's and George Walker's time in vaudeville.

== Discography ==
Williams had at least 142 songs recorded.

- "Nobody" (1905)
- "The Moon Shines on the Moonshine" (1919)

== Theater ==
- In Dahomey (1903)
- Abyssinia (1906)
- Bandanna Land (1908)
- Ziegfeld Follies of 1910
- Ziegfeld Follies of 1911
- Ziegfeld Follies of 1912
- Ziegfeld Follies of 1917
- Ziegfeld Follies of 1919

== Filmography ==
- Lime Kiln Field Day (1913)
- The Natural Born Gambler (1915), Biograph comedy film featuring Williams's pantomime poker playing
- Fish (1916), Biograph short comedy film with Williams's character shirking work around the family home to go fishing

== See also ==
- The Frogs (club)
- African American musical theater
- List of people from Harlem
