= Terrific Street =

Short-lived San Francisco entertainment district

Looking east down Pacific Street from Kearny Street during 1913. (San Francisco History Center, San Francisco Public Library)

Terrific Street was a short-lived entertainment district on San Francisco's Barbary Coast during the early 20th century. It consisted of dance halls, jazz clubs, and various kinds of drinking establishments. Terrific Street was centered upon a single block of Pacific Street, which was one of the earliest streets to cut through the hills of San Francisco, starting near Portsmouth Square and continuing east to the first shipping docks at Buena Vista Cove. The district was located between Kearny and Montgomery streets on Pacific Street (now Avenue).

The term 'Terrific Street' was first used in the mid-1890s by musicians in describing the quality of music at Pacific Street's clubs, and indeed the first jazz clubs of San Francisco occurred there. At the beginning, the prevailing music was ragtime and slow blues, but within the first decade of the 20th century the music clubs began to develop early forms of jazz. The district also attracted many famous entertainers such as actress Sarah Bernhardt, Russian ballet dancer Anna Pavlova, and musicians Sophie Tucker, Al Jolson, and Jelly Roll Morton. A principal attraction of Terrific Street was dancing, and many nationally known dance steps like the Texas Tommy and the Turkey Trot were invented on Terrific Street. However, the district's existence was short-lived, and Terrific Street's dominance slowly came to an end by 1921 after a newspaper's crusade to shut down the district, and severe restrictions were placed upon its dance halls by the Police Commission.

== Early Barbary Coast ==
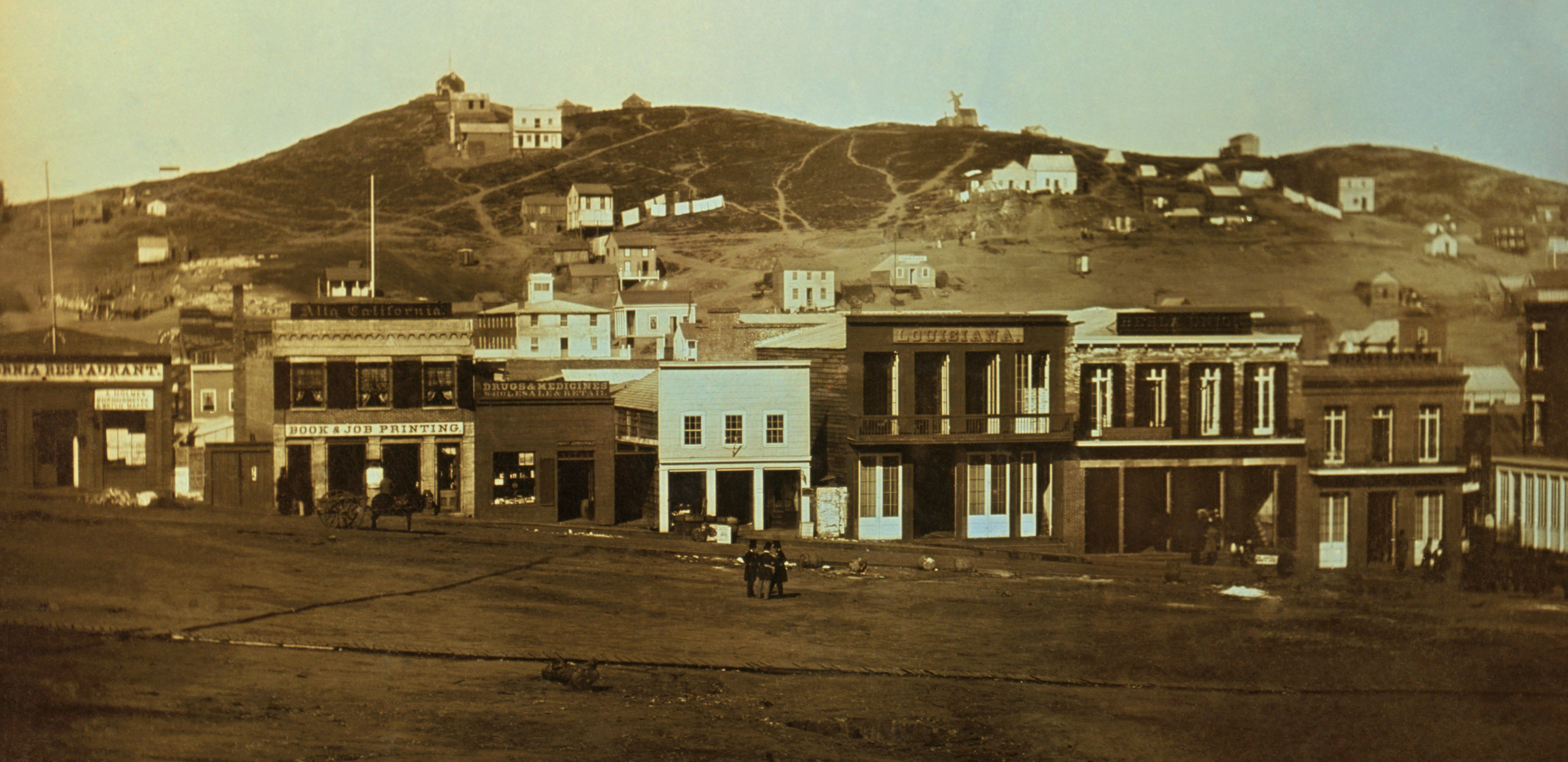
Portsmouth Square, San Francisco, during the gold rush, 1851.

Pacific Street went through many transformations from its early days of the 1860s when it was the main thoroughfare for the vice-ridden Barbary Coast. The Barbary Coast was born during the California Gold Rush of 1849 when the population of San Francisco was growing at an exponential rate due to a rapid influx of tens of thousands of miners trying to find gold. The early decades of the Barbary Coast were marred by persistent lawlessness, gambling, administrative graft, vigilante justice, and prostitution. The Barbary Coast's most violent and vice-ridden days occurred between the 1860s to the 1880s, when its theft, harassment issues, and violence caused most San Franciscans to avoid the area.

However, with the passage of time San Francisco's government gained strength and competence, and the Barbary Coast's maturing entertainment scene of dance halls and jazz clubs later influenced America's culture. Entertaining this large influx of miners, new entrepreneurs, and sailors became be a huge business and resulted in varied and inventive forms of entertainment. Except for some auction houses and stores, the stretch of Pacific Street from the waterfront to Kearny Street was packed with drinking establishments and dance halls. Due to progressive music clubs like Purcell's which enabled jazz to get an early foothold in San Francisco, there were positive cultural aspects developing in the district.

The Barbary Coast's century-long evolution upon these few blocks of Pacific Street went through massive incarnations due to the city's rapid cultural development during its transition into the 20th century. Terrific Street was just such a later transformation of the early Barbary Coast.

== After the 1906 earthquake ==
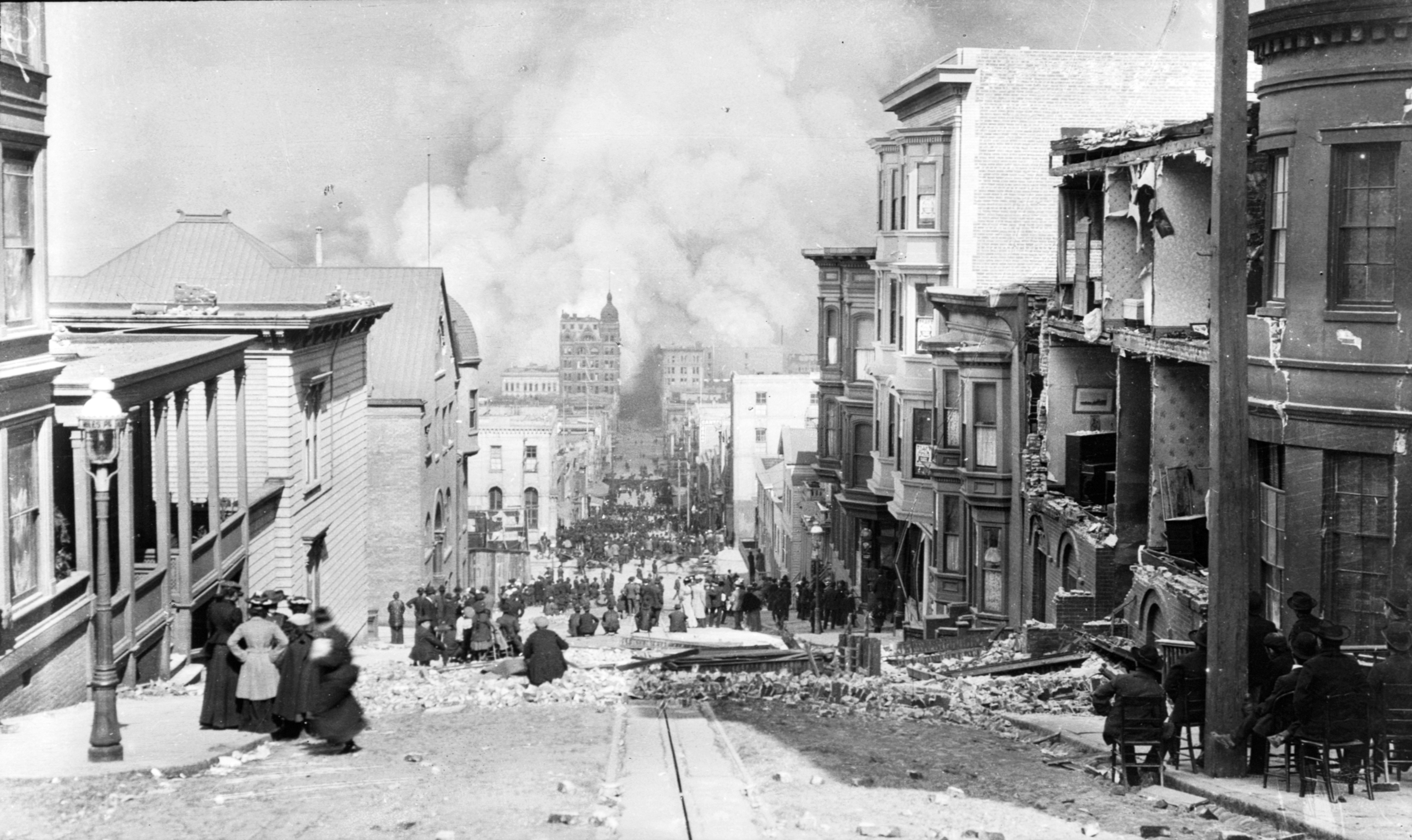
Looking east toward the fire on Sacramento Street just after the earthquake – April 18, 1906.

Due to the earthquake and fire of 1906, most of the buildings on that stretch of Pacific Street were destroyed. However the city's financial boosters then saw an opportunity to clean up Barbary Coast, and transform it into an entertainment area that could be acceptable for every-day San Franciscans. Possessing a new sense of civic pride, the boosters invested heavily in reconstruction, and within three months over a dozen dance halls and a dozen bars were rebuilt and operating. This new incarnation of Pacific Street was gentrified and tame compared to the lawless pre-earthquake version of the Barbary Coast, and Terrific Street became a tourist mecca for middle-class youth.

This time around, things were different—the city and its merchants were going to pressure the police and club owners into quelling the violence of the old Barbary Coast. During that earlier era of the Barbary Coast, people were not even safe when they were inside of the saloons or dance halls. Oftentimes customers might be pickpocketed by the waitresses themselves, and also might be drugged unconscious so that they could be robbed within that establishment. Because merchants and politicians committed to reversing that previous predatory behavior and attempted to protect customers from theft and harassment, they could expect much wider appeal by attracting middle and upper class customers. As a result, the district then drew tremendous crowds, and at night its brightly lit block could be seen from across the bay in Oakland despite the fact that neon lights had not yet been invented.

The new tone of the neighborhood attracted a type of tourist called a slummer—middle and upper class individuals who go to the rough side of town to see how the other half lives. And in keeping with that tourist theme, the dance halls and concert saloons were referred to as resorts within local newspapers. These resorts offered cleaned-up entertainment venues consisting of large dance floors, variety shows, and musical bands. To further accommodate and protect the slumming tourists, the dance hall owners installed a separate raised viewing gallery over the dance floor which became known as a slummers' balcony. Though the slummers in the balconies intended to view the violence and depravity of the early Barbary Coast of which they had heard, what they really got was only a staged performance by employees of the dance hall. Dance hall owners paid employees to stage nasty dancing, fake fights, and scuffles on the dance floor for their gaping viewers' entertainment. The owners purposely geared their fake floor shows to shock, but not to repulse. High prices were charged to those in the slummers' balcony and there were differing prices for alcohol, depending on whether a customer was on the dance floor, in the slummers' gallery, or in a private booth. The Hippodrome, Olympia, Midway, and Thalia dance halls all had slummers' balconies.

The large dance floors became a main attraction for those in the slummers' balconies. A principal attraction of Terrific Street was dancing, and many nationally know dance steps like the Texas Tommy and the Turkey Trot were invented in these dance halls. During the early days of Terrific Street, the most common musical genres were ragtime and slow blues, but with the start of the 20th century the musicians became involved with America's latest musical genre, jazz (from jass). The house band at Purcell's Cafe was the first band in history to use the word jazz in its name when it became called the So Different Jazz Band. The musical venues on Pacific Street usually started out with just a piano, then later working up to four, and then six pieces, according to what the establishment could afford. Some dance halls hosted bands with as many as 18 musicians. From the seeds of cheap mining-town amusements of the old Barbary Coast, Terrific Street emerged as a vibrant district which nurtured the beginnings of jazz music.

== Dance halls and concert saloons ==
Terrific Street's dance halls and concert saloons give an insightful view into the district's cultural identity. One advantage of the west coast's lawless nature was a lack of the east coast's racial segregation laws, which enabling integrated establishments that were called black and tan clubs. The brightest aspect of Terrific Street's culture was its robust jazz music scene which grew from earlier versions of ragtime and blues. Jazz may have started in New Orleans, but due to clubs like Purcell's and musicians Sid LeProtti and Jelly Roll Morton, San Francisco inspired composers and band leaders like Art Hickman and Paul Whiteman who taught this jazz to mainstream America.

Musician Sid LeProtti recalls the excitement of Terrific Street:

We used to call it Terrific Street. I can remember the time you could come across San Francisco Bay on the ferryboat and you could pick out that blaze of electric lights on Pacific Street. There wasn't any neon in them days; just millions of electric lights. There was The Midway, The Hippodrome, The Thalia, Louie Gomez's, Parenti's Saloon, Griffin's, Spider Kelly's, The Bella Union, and a slug of other places like that. You could see all the lights from them for miles in any direction. I've seen good times on Terrific Street when the street was so crowded with people nobody could go through there in an automobile, and I remember the night the officers of the law come in and closed everything down...

=== Purcell's Café ===
Purcell's was located at 520 Pacific Street, and during the early 20th century was regarded as one of the most important music clubs of the west coast. In its early years it was also known as the So Different Club, but later adopted the name of Purcell's. Purcell's was started by two African Americans, Lew Purcell and Sam King, who previously worked as Pullman Porters. Though owned by African Americans, the club was open to all races and was known as a black and tan club due to its audience's racial diversity.

Purcell's was smaller than most dance halls and was furnished with just a bar, a few tables and chairs, and 20 or more benches which faced a dance floor. Though small, it was a very innovative establishment when it came to making money from its customers. On the opposite side of the room from the bar was a large partition. Behind that partition were female employees who were paid to dance with the customers. Customers could buy copper tokens for 20 cents each that entitled them to one dance with one of the dancers. As soon as the customer was on the dance floor, the floor manager approached them and urged them to order either a whiskey, cigar, or beer. Using a token or a dance-ticket to buy a dance from a female employee is the hallmark of taxi dancing, and indeed taxi dancing was first invented in San Francisco during this era.

Oftentimes the band played as many as 30 songs in an hour. Because of the rigorous performing schedule, it was not unusual to find piano players whose fingers were protectively taped, and the pianists often wore out a piano in just a year's time. Dancing was a major attraction of Terrific Street, and Purcell's management understood that its audience wanted to see the newest, most thrilling varieties of dance and music such as ragtime, blues, Turkey Trot, and the Texas Tommy. Gene Harris, a white pianist at the nearby Thalia dance hall stated "All the new dances came from Purcell's which hired the best colored entertainers from coast to coast."

During pianist Sid LeProtti's first time at performing at Purcell's, club owner Sam King noticed his special talents and immediately made Sid LeProtti the house band's new leader. Sid LeProtti became a major jazz influence on Terrific Street, and his extensive interviews left behind one of the better documented descriptions of the district during its heyday. By 1915, Sid LeProtti had rebuilt the So Different Jazz Band into one of the finest performing groups of the San Francisco Bay Area. They are said to have been the first band in America to use the new term 'jazz' in its name. His house band consisted of a clarinet, baritone sax, flute, piano, string bass, and drums.

LeProtti's grandmother was a famous contralto of San Francisco, and around 1860 she became the first African American woman to sing on a stage in California. Also fluent in German, LeProtti's grandmother arranged for him to take piano lessons from a German music teacher who trained LeProtti in classical music and encouraged him to memorize songs—something that later helped his skills in jazz improvisation. LeProtti later evolved from musician to composer, and like other Barbary Coast musicians freely shared many of his arrangements with others (one pianist later falsely claimed LeProtti's "Sid's Rag" as his own work, and it became in modified form, part of the popular tune "Canadian Capers").

Despite its sophistication in music, Purcell's was not a tame club, and slummers often came there to see fights and risque dancing. LeProtti recalled in an Alan Lomax interview how violence occasionally occurred. On one night a customer pulled out a pistol and started shooting, only to have the bartender hit him over the head with a whiskey bottle which ultimately caused his death.

=== The Thalia ===
The Thalia opened in 1911, and with a team of six bartenders and over 100 female employees became the largest of the dance halls on Pacific Street. From its start the Thalia received much support from the police department and was allowed stay open until 3 AM, which was way past the 1am curfew that the other dance halls had to abide by. The Thalia was located in a large barn-sized building which had double-tiered slummers' balconies for its many spectators. It had a large rectangular dance floor, an 18-piece orchestra, and also had a smaller band which played on the sidewalk to lure in customers. Dances such as the Texas Tommy and Turkey Trot which became popular across the country, most likely originated in the Thalia or possibly Purcell's. The Thalia was often described as the place where the new dances came from. Differing from Purcell's by its large size and having slummers' balconies, the Thalia was possibly the place where middle-class San Franciscans got their first look at the new ragtime dance steps, like the Texas Tommy and Turkey Trot. Texas Tommy was described as the most prominent dance of the time, and it later spread across the country.

As police harassment escalated on Pacific Street during the late 1910s, the Thalia was the most stubborn club for them to shut. In 1915 when a liquor ban eventually was enforced in all dance halls, the Thalia preserved their business as a dance hall by declaring that they had become a dance academy that enabled customers to pay by the dance. With that business model, the Thalia then became one of the earliest dance halls to offer taxi dancing without alcohol being served on the premises. During the Prohibition days of the 1920s, and especially in Chicago, the term 'dance academy' became a code word for a taxi dance hall. By 1921 even the alcohol-free taxi dance halls like Thalia finally were outlawed when it became illegal in San Francisco for any female employee to dance with a customer for money. To this day, taxi dancing is still illegal in San Francisco.

=== The Jupiter ===
Around 1917 Jelly Roll Morton came to San Francisco and opened the Jupiter club with his paramour, Anita Gonzalez. Though born in New Orleans, he traveled extensively at a young age. Music historian Alan Lomax's taped interviews and performances by Morton provide one of the most insightful looks into jazz during its earliest days on the west coast. Though being raised by an upper class Creole family, his apprenticeship on piano took place at a young age inside the bordellos of New Orleans' Storyville district. While Morton may have not have invented jazz, he was one of the first musicians to think about it in an abstract sense, and his thoughts are still considered relevant today. Besides being a versatile pianist, Morton's distinction was his ability at composing music which went far beyond the ragtime music of his day. Music historians say he was arguably the foremost jazz composer until Duke Ellington came on the scene.

The Jupiter club was located in a basement just around the corner from Purcell's on Columbus Avenue, and like Purcell's it was also a black and tan club open to all races. With time Morton developed a very competitive attitude towards Sid LeProtti and tried to steal members from Purcell's house band with higher pay. However they all refused because Morton was known to be a perfectionist and somewhat dictatorial with his sidemen. Despite performing in a basement, Morton's band was sometimes as large as ten pieces.

By the time Morton arrived in San Francisco, the Barbary Coast district was already under siege by the police department, which was in turn was fueled by a Hearst newspaper's crusade against the district. Morton, known for his brash and outspoken nature, quickly alienated the police department when he questioned why he could not acquire a dance permit for his club. When interviewed by Lomax in 1938, Morton described his meeting with the police captain. After insisting that he knew his rights about access to a dance permit, a police officer replied, "You heard what the captain said boy, we'll close you down if you allow dancing." Morton implies racial prejudice as a motivation by the police when he explains, "my place was black and tan – for colored and white alike." At that time many San Franciscans frowned on interracial dating.

Things escalated and the police occasionally hung around the Jupiter's door and harass Morton's customers by saying "Why did you come here? What's your name? Don't you know this place is likely to be raided any time?" In yet another incident the police convinced one of his waiters to plant a bottle of whiskey in the club in an attempt to shut the club down. That attempt failed but the harassment still continued. Frustrated with continuing police harassment, Anita Gonzalez convinced Morton in 1922 to leave the Jupiter and to find work in Seattle.

=== Spider Kelly's Saloon ===
Dancing couples on the dance floor of Spider Kelly's. San Francisco History Center, San Francisco Public Library

Spider Kelly, born James Curtin, was a lightweight boxer and trainer who immigrated to San Francisco from Ireland while an adolescent. But Kelly gained more fame by opening this dance hall in the building formerly occupied by the Seattle Saloon at 574 Pacific Street. In 1919 a local journalist described Spider Kelly's dance hall in stating: "Epicures and connoisseurs of good things in life say that an hour spent in Spider's cafe is a sure cure for the tired feeling and will remove to oblivion all forms of melancholy." Like Purcell's So Different Cafe and the Jupiter, Spider Kelly's was known as a black and tan club, meaning that all races were welcome. Kelly knew what the public wanted, staged racy floor shows, and his dance hall was known as one of rowdiest clubs of Terrific Street. It was rumored that bullets from a neighboring bar next door occasionally came through the walls of Spider Kelly's. In response, Kelly's took extra precaution and installed a sheet-iron boiler plate behind their bar to block any stray bullets that might come through the adjoining wall. Despite the club's rumored reputation, archived photos show well-dressed adolescent couples enjoying a harmless night of dancing while doing dances like the Turkey Trot, the Bunny Hug, Grizzly Bear, and the Texas Tommy.

=== Seattle Saloon and the Dash ===
Not all the Pacific Street dance halls were ready to clean up their act and protect their customers from harassment and theft—in fact some, like the Seattle Saloon and Dance Hall, went in the other direction. At the Seattle, the men worked as waiters while the female employees encouraged the customers to buy drinks, and while dancing with them picked their pockets. The girls split the stolen money with the management and received a commission on any drinks or dances that they sold. It was reported that drunken men frequently were lured into the performers' dressing rooms where they were robbed.

But even more outrageous was their door-key racket. When being pursued by an amorous male customer, some of the waitresses suggested that the customer buy a key to their room so that they could have a romantic tryst after closing time. If the customer was puzzled why he should have to buy a key, the waitress often replied that she could not get away from the dance hall while it was open, and that she had a very jealous boyfriend who would not allow them to be seen leaving the dance hall together. The cost of a dancer's door key was between one and five dollars, and some of the more popular girls sold as many as a dozen keys a night. Needless to say, none of the customers could find a door which fit their key despite the fact that they could be seen wandering about in the early hours of the morning going from door to door. The police eventually cracked down on the Seattle and stopped the door-key racket from continuing.

Things got even more bizarre for the building when in 1908 that dance hall was sold to a new owner who renamed it The Dash. The new owners remodeled the interior, adding many private booths. Then they fired all the female-dancing employees and replaced them with men who wore women's clothing. The Call, a local newspaper, described the Dash as "one of the vilest dance halls ever maintained in San Francisco". The Dash was not very successful and due to political pressure later closed in the same year that it was opened.

== Demise ==
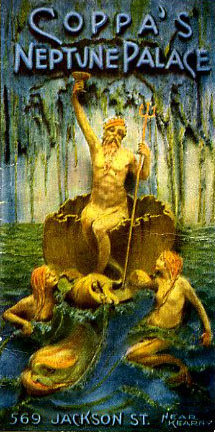
Coppa's Neptune Palace was on Jackson square, but also closed in 1914 after the Police Commission crackdown.

An extreme shift in political policy came about in 1911 when a new mayor and reformer, James Rolph, was elected to the first of ten terms. The political tides had reversed, and the reform movement was gaining great momentum. Rolph and his reformist city supervisors along with William Randolf Hearst's newspaper, the Examiner, sought to shut the district and Terrific Street down.

Oddly enough, it was a popular dance called the Texas Tommy that was one of the early steps in disabling the district. The name "Texas Tommy" itself was a concern, because the term 'Tommy' was said to be synonymous with prostitute. When it was announced that the infamous dance would be performed at a local theater, many concerned citizens and the police went to see the dance for the first time. But they came away surprised, and declared that there was nothing obscene or distasteful about the strenuous dance.

The dance then became very popular with the youth of middle and upper classes. However, members of older generations who had not even seen the dance began to condemn it, and parents feared that the dance would harm the moral fiber of their children. And at the same time, businesses which surrounded the district further inflamed the controversy, while trying rid themselves of the competing dance halls upon Terrific Street. By 1912, the expanding war in the press against the Texas Tommy caused the public to fear and oppose all other ragtime dances as well.

William Randolf Hearst, owner of the Examiner and whose name frequently is attached to the term 'yellow journalism', was instrumental in causing the demise of Terrific Street. Just before election time in September 1913, Hearst's Examiner launched a major crusade against Terrific Street "with all the fanfare of furious excitement which has always characterized Hearst's journalistic wars", when the Examiner published a full page editorial condemning the district.

In response, just 10 days after the Examiner's full-page editorial, the police commission adopted resolutions that no dancing was allowed in any establishment of the district which served alcohol, that no women – employees or patrons – were permitted in any saloon of the district, and that even electric signs were forbidden. Due to San Francisco's small municipal government, the police department was given an overwhelming amount of responsibility for the Pacific Street scene.

As a result, some drinking establishments fired their female employees and became straight saloons, and others closed their businesses. Some musicians moved to LA, while others performed at Oakland's Seventh Street jazz scene. Some of the larger dance halls moved to other districts and managed to survive for several more years by masquerading as dance academies or closed dance halls, but they never regained their previous popularity. After the 1913 liquor ban, the Thalia stopped serving liquor, declared itself a dance academy, and hired nearly 100 women to dance with customers on a dance-by-dance basis. 'Dance academy' is a code word for a taxi dance hall, and the term was used for another two decades as taxi dancing migrated to Chicago and then other large cities. A report by the Public Dance Hall Committee of San Francisco Center of California Civic League of Women Voters states:

In September, 1913, the Police Commissioner prohibited dancing in any cafe, restaurant, or saloon where liquor was sold. This resolution wiped out dancing on the [Barbary] Coast and resulted in the appearance of the so-called "closed" hall in the districts adjoining. There the girls were paid to dance with the men on a commission basis and salary. Patrons paid ten cent for each dance, lasting less than two minutes. About six hundred girls were employed in these 'closed' dance halls.

The closed dance halls were the first version of latter-day taxi dance halls. They were called closed because most of the time the only women permitted in the club were the taxi dancers. The final blow, which ended the entertainment scene, came in 1921 when taxi dancing and its closed dance halls were forbidden by law. Prohibition also caused a complete absence of alcohol in 1920. In 1917, the brothels eventually closed due to the Red Light Abatement Act, but by that time all the excitement of Terrific Street had vanished.

== Pacific Street today ==
Pacific Street, now Avenue, no longer has bars, dance halls, or entertainment clubs. As of the first decade of the 21st century, its narrow corridor is populated with offices, design firms, and law firms despite the fact that many of the original buildings from the Terrific Street era still remain. The old Hippodrome dance hall, also known as the Moulin Rouge at one time, now houses an art store, Artist & Craftsman Supply. One of the old secret tunnels from the Barbary Coast days can be seen in the basement of that art store. The two photos below show exactly the same three buildings, but at different points in time. From left to right, they are Spider Kelly's dance hall, the Hippodrome, and Purcell's So Different Café. Within the 2014 photograph Spider Kelly's former dance hall has brown brick, the Hippodrome's building has orange brick, and Purcell's So Different Café building has brown brick and is behind a tree.

Pacific Street – Then and Now
Pacific Street in 1909 (San Francisco History Center, San Francisco Public Library)

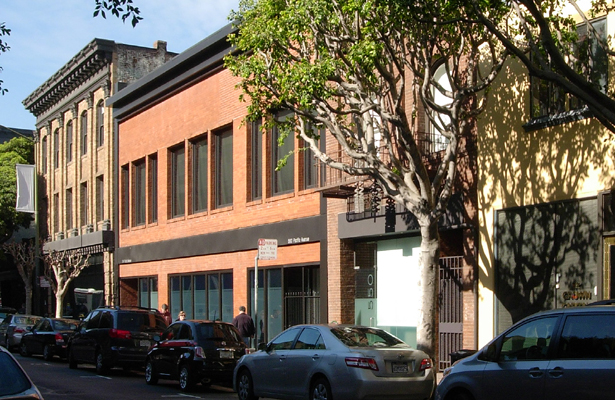
The same view of Pacific Street, but in 2014

== See also ==
- Barbary Coast
- 1906 earthquake
- Gold Rush of 1849
- Jackson Square
- North Beach
- Jazz
- Blues
- Ragtime
- Taxi dance hall

== Sources ==
- Asbury, Herbert (1933). The Barbary Coast: An Informal History of the San Francisco Underworld. Thunder's Mouth Press.
- Barker, Malcolm (1996). More San Francisco Memoirs, 1852-1899: The Ripening Years. Londonborn Publications. ISBN 0930235053.
- Boyd, Nan Alamilla (2013). "Homos Invade S.F.! San Francisco's history as a wide-open town" in Creating a Place for Ourselves: Lesbian, Gay, and Bisexual Community Histories, Brett Beemyn, ed. Routledge. ISBN 113522241X, pp. 73–95.
- Cressey, Paul (1932). The Taxi-Dance Hall: A Sociological Study in Commercialized Recreation and City Life. University of Chicago Press. ISBN 9780226120515.
- Fleming, E.J. (2005). Carole Landis: A Tragic Life in Hollywood. McFarland & Company. ISBN 0786482656.
- Gioia, Ted (1997). The History of Jazz. Oxford University Press. ISBN 0195399706.
- Gushee, Lawrence (2005). Pioneers of Jazz: The Story of the Creole Band. Oxford University Press. ISBN 0199889791.
- Knowles, Mark (1954). The Wicked Waltz and Other Scandalous Dances. McFarland & Company.
- Lang, Arne K. (2012). The Nelson-Wolgast Fight and the San Francisco Boxing Scene, 1900-1914. McFarland. ISBN 978-0786490394.
- Lukas, Gary Paul (2010). Seven Years in Sodom. Xulon Press. ISBN 978-1612150574.
- Miller, Leta E. (2012). Music and Politics in San Francisco: From the 1906 Quake to the Second World War. University of California Press. ISBN 978-0520268913.
- Montanarelli, Lisa; Harrison, Ann (2005). Strange But True San Francisco: Tales of the City by the Bay. Globe Pequot Press. ISBN 076273681X.
- Pastras, Philip (2001). Dead Man Blues: Jelly Roll Morton Way Out West. University of California Press. ISBN 0-520-23687-4.
- Richards, Rand (2002). Historic Walks in San Francisco. Heritage House Publishers. ISBN 1879367033.
- Smith, James R. (2005). San Francisco's Lost Landmarks. Word Dancer Press. ISBN 1-884995-44-6.
- Stoddard, Tom (1982). Jazz on the Barbary Coast. Heyday Books. ISBN 189077104X. "jazz on the barbary coast."
- Strickland, Rebecca (2006). "The Texas Tommy, Its History, Controversies, and Influence on American Vernacular Dance (MA thesis)". Florida State University.
