= Texas Tommy =

Texas Tommy may refer to:

- Texas Tommy (dance), a social dance
- Texas Tommy (dance move), a dance move
- Texas Tommy (food), a grilled, split hot dog with bacon and cheese
- Texas Tommy (film), 1928 American film
