= Vernon and Irene Castle =

British-American ballroom dancing duo

External videos
- Vernon and Irene Castle in The Whirl of Life (1915)

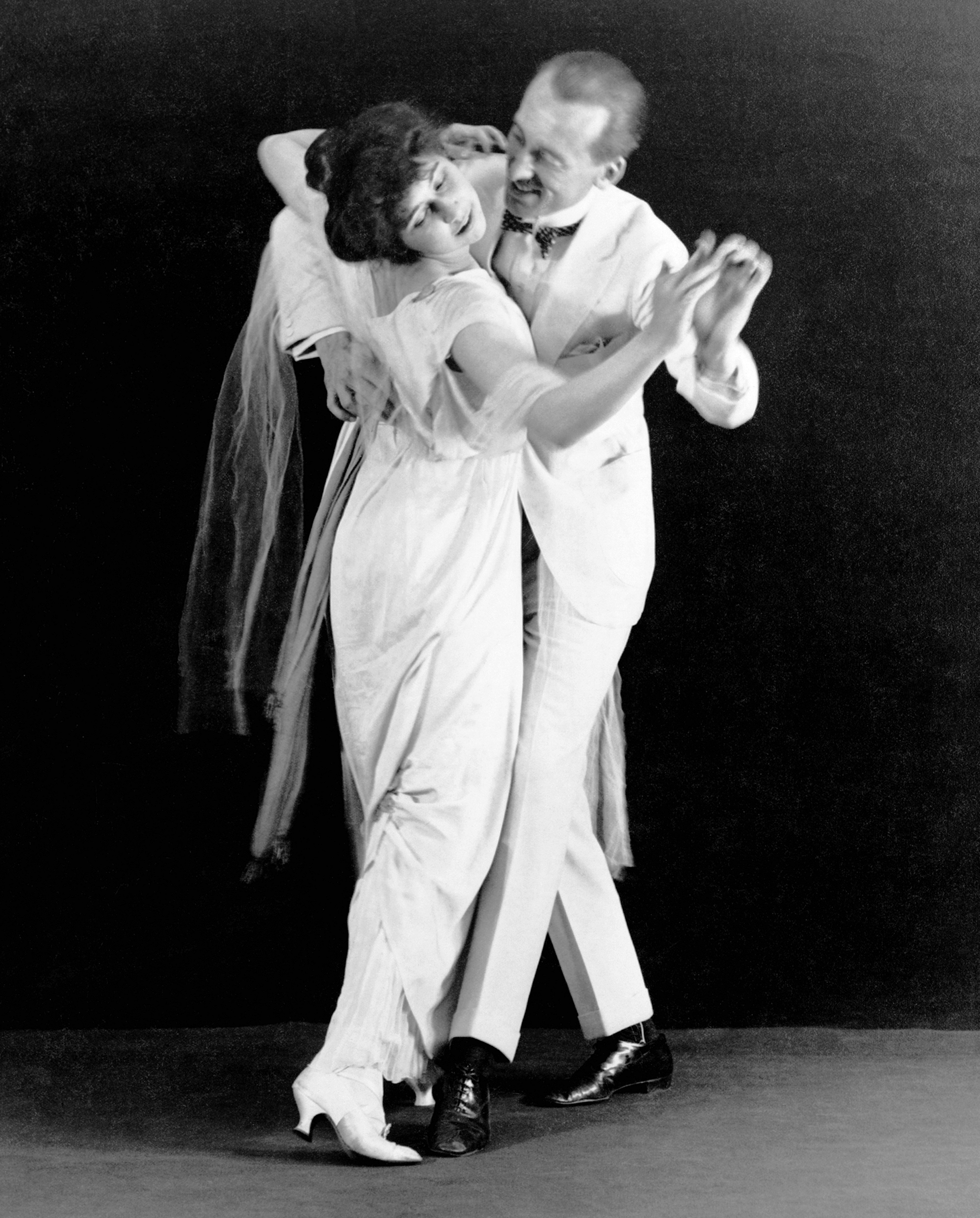
Irene and Vernon Castle, c. 1912

Vernon and Irene Castle were a husband-and-wife team of ballroom dancers and dance teachers who appeared on Broadway and in silent films in the early 20th century. They are credited with reviving the popularity of modern dancing. Castle was a stage name: Vernon (2 May 1887 – 15 February 1918) was born William Vernon Blyth in England. Irene (7 April 1893 – 25 January 1969) was born Irene Foote in the United States.

The couple reached the peak of their popularity in Irving Berlin's first Broadway show, Watch Your Step (1914), in which they refined and popularized the foxtrot. They also helped to promote ragtime, jazz rhythms and African-American music for dance. Irene became a fashion icon through her appearances on stage and in early movies, and both Castles were in demand as teachers and writers on dance.

After serving with distinction as a pilot in the British Royal Flying Corps during World War I, Vernon died in a plane crash on a flight training base near Fort Worth, Texas, in 1918. Irene continued to perform solo in Broadway, vaudeville and motion picture productions over the next decade. She remarried three times, had children and became an activist for animal welfare. In 1939, her life with Vernon was dramatized in The Story of Vernon and Irene Castle.

== Rise to fame ==
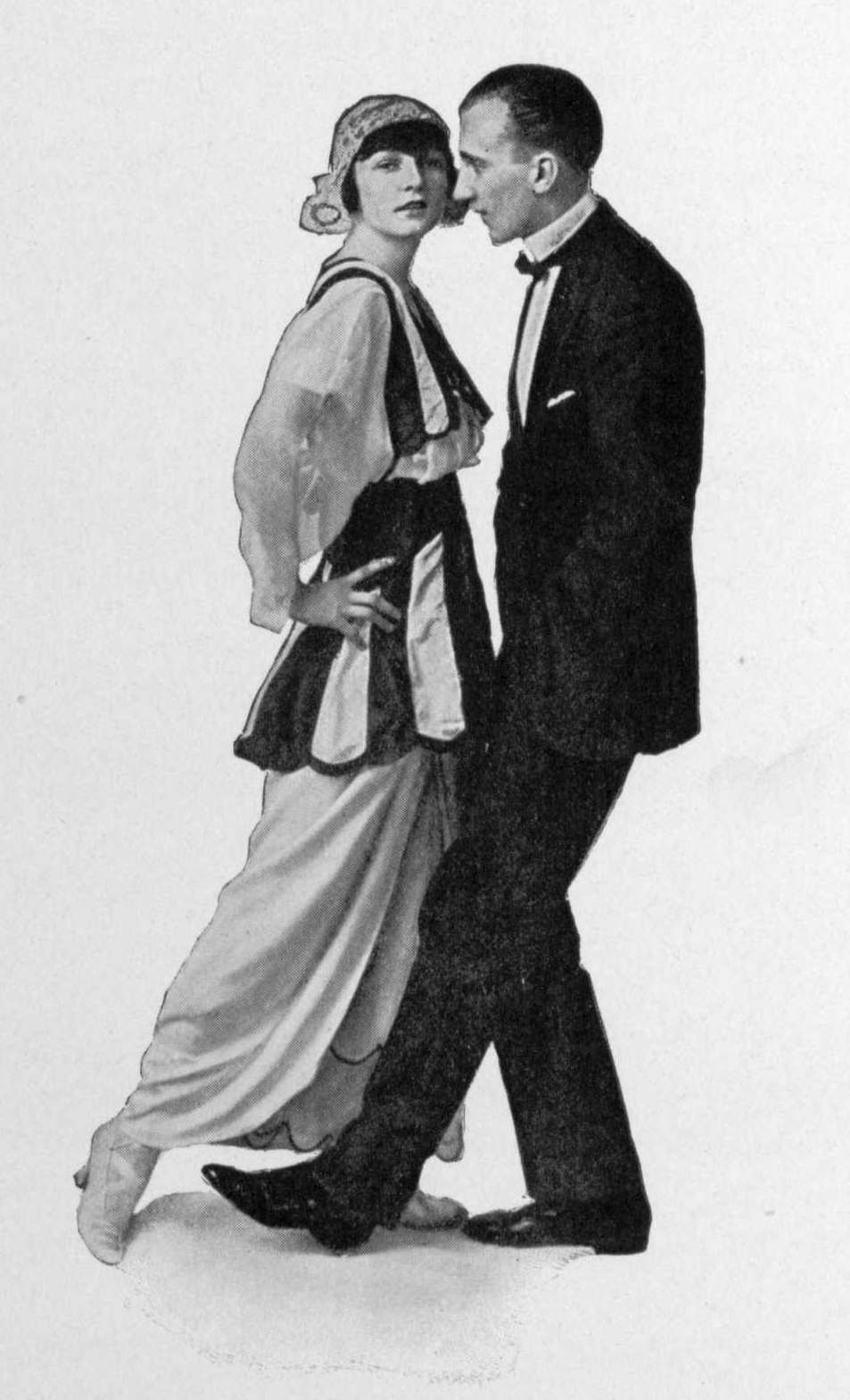
A hands-free Tango step that the Castles originated; photograph from their 1914 bestseller Modern Dancing

Vernon, the son of a pub owner, was born on 2 May 1887 and raised in Norwich, Norfolk. Initially training to become a civil engineer, he moved to New York in 1906 with his sister, Coralie Blythe, and her husband Lawrence Grossmith, both established actors. There he was given a small part on stage by Lew Fields, which led to further acting work, and he became established as a comic actor, singer, dancer and conjuror, under the stage name Vernon Castle. As a dancer in comedic roles, his specialty was playing a gentleman drunk, who elegantly fell about the stage while trying to hide his condition.

Irene was born on 7 April 1893 in New Rochelle, New York, the daughter of a physician. She studied dancing and performed in several amateur theatricals before meeting Vernon Castle at the New Rochelle Rowing Club in 1910. With his help, she was hired for her first professional job, a small dancing part in "The Summer Widowers".

On 28 May 1911, the two were married in Irene's hometown, New Rochelle. After their wedding, Irene joined Vernon in The Hen-Pecks (1911), a production in which he was a featured player. The couple then traveled to Paris to perform in a dance revue. The show closed quickly, but the Castles were then hired as a dance act by the Café de Paris in Monaco. They performed the latest American ragtime dances, such as the Turkey Trot and the Grizzly Bear. The two were soon the rage of Parisian society; their success was widely reported in the United States, preparing their way for a triumphant return to New York in 1912.

When they returned to the U.S., their success was repeated on a far wider scale. Making their New York debut in 1912 at a branch of the Cafe de Paris operated by Louis Martin, who had given them their start in Paris, the duo were soon in demand on stage, in vaudeville and in motion pictures. They also became staples of Broadway. Among their shows were The Sunshine Girl (1913) and Watch Your Step (1914), which boasted Irving Berlin's first score, written for the Castles. In this extravaganza, the couple refined and popularized the Foxtrot. After its New York run, Watch Your Step toured through 1916.

In 1914, the couple opened a dancing school in New York called "Castle House", a nightclub called "Castles by the Sea" on the Boardwalk in Long Beach, New York, and a restaurant, "Sans Souci". At Castle House, they taught New York society the latest dance steps by day and greeted guests and performed at their club and cafe at night. They also were in demand for private lessons and appearances at fashionable parties. Despite their fame, they often found themselves treated as hired menials; if a rich client was too demanding, Vernon would quote a fee of a thousand dollars an hour for lessons and often get it.

== Film and fashion ==
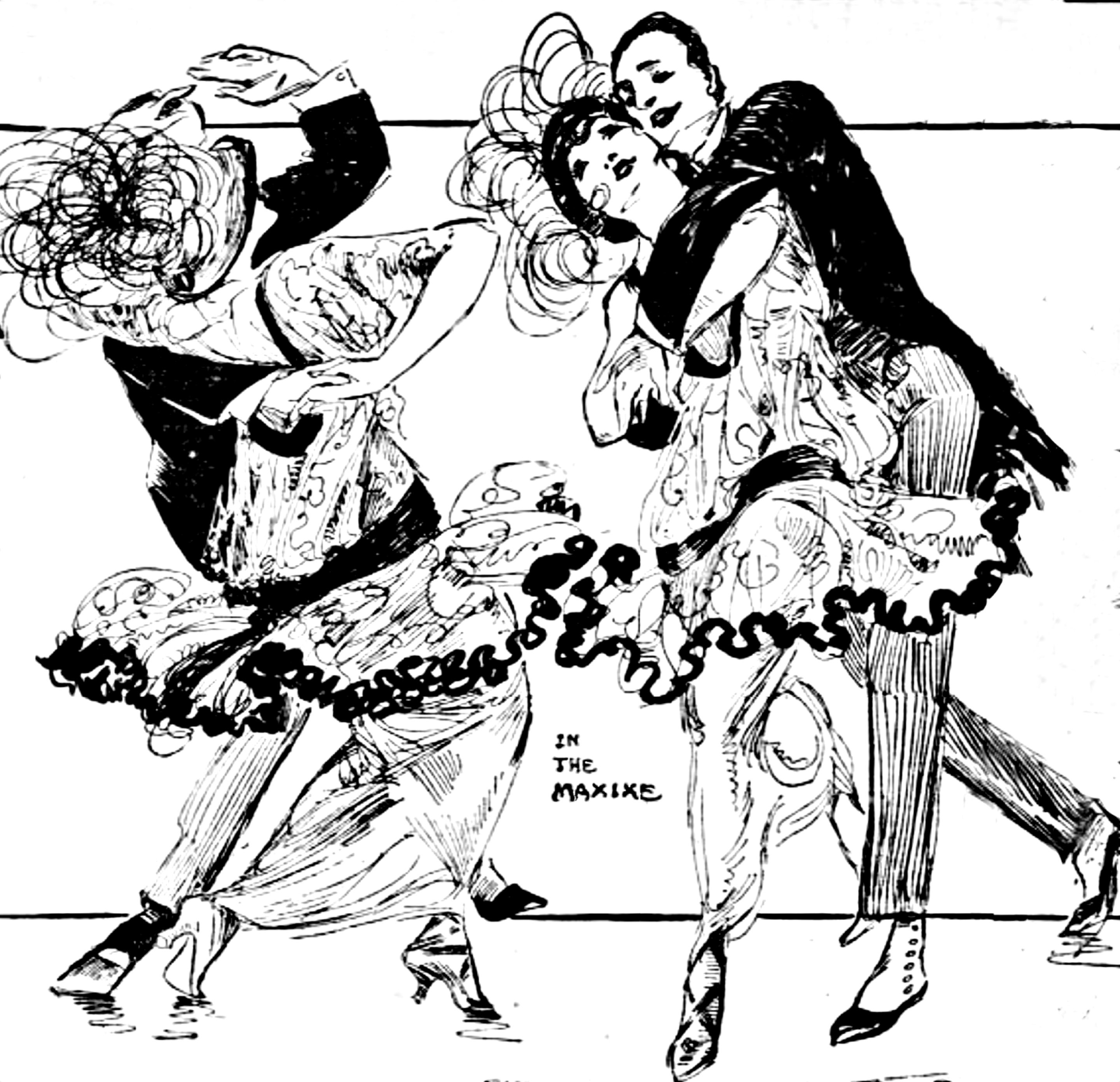
Marguerite Martyn sketched the Castles dancing the maxixe in 1914.

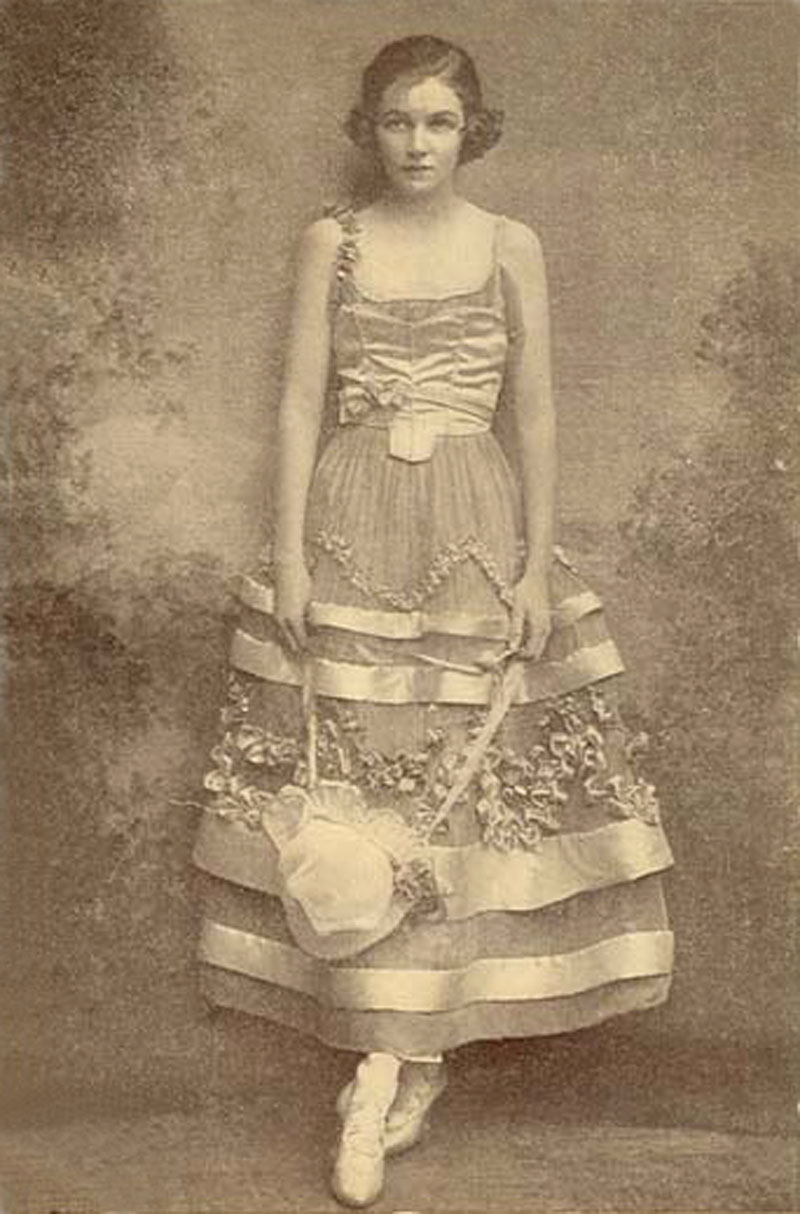
Irene, costumed by Lucile for Watch Your Step, 1914

As America's premier dance team, the Castles were trendsetters in a number of arenas. Their enthusiasm for dance encouraged admirers to try new forms of social dance. Considered paragons of respectability and class, the Castles specifically helped remove the stigma of vulgarity from close dancing. The pair's image as a harmoniously married couple further promoted the Progressive Era ideals of a wholesome domestic relationship that was achievable through social dance. The Castles' performances, often set to ragtime and jazz rhythms, also popularized African-American music among well-heeled whites. The Castles appeared in a newsreel called Social and Theatrical Dancing in 1914 and wrote a bestselling instructional book, Modern Dancing, later that year. The pair also starred in a feature film called The Whirl of Life (1915), which was well received by critics and public alike.

As the couple's celebrity increased in the mid-1910s, Irene Castle became a major fashion trendsetter, initiating the vogue for shorter, fuller skirts and loose, elasticized corsets. She is also credited with introducing American women in 1913 or 1914 to the bob – the short, boyish hairstyle favored by flappers in the 1920s. The elegant, yet simple, flowing gowns Irene wore on stage and screen were regularly featured in Vogue, Harper's Bazaar and other fashion magazines. These were often supplied by the famous couturier Lucile, but Irene also designed some of her clothes herself. The slender, elegant Castles were pioneers in other ways: they traveled with a black orchestra, James Reese Europe's Society Orchestra, and had an openly lesbian manager, Elisabeth Marbury.

The Castles endorsed Victor Records and Victrolas, issuing records by the Castle House Orchestra, led by James Reese Europe, a pioneering figure in African-American music. They also lent their names to advertising for other products, from cigars and cosmetics to shoes and hats.

== World War I: Vernon's death ==
In 1915, Vernon decided to fight in World War I and began flight school in the U.S., leaving the touring cast of Watch Your Step. He received his pilot's certificate in early 1916. The Castles gave two farewell performances at the Hippodrome Theatre in New York in January 1916, accompanied by John Philip Sousa and his band. Vernon sailed for England to enlist as a pilot in the Royal Flying Corps during World War I. Flying over the Western Front, he completed 300 combat missions, shot down two aircraft and was awarded the Croix de Guerre in 1917. Posted to Canada to train new pilots at Camp Mohawk in Ontario, he took part in concerts in the evenings. He was promoted to captain, and then transferred with the rest of his unit to the U.S. for winter training at Camp Taliaferro.

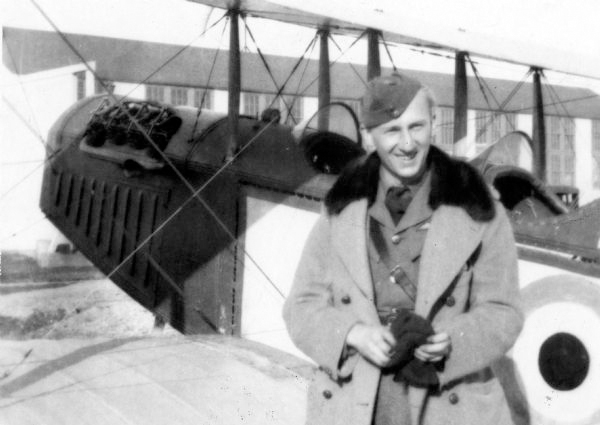
Captain Vernon Castle a few days before his death in 1918

Late in 1917, while he was away, Irene appeared in a star-studded revue, Miss 1917. Although she was singled out for praise by reviewers, she was unhappy performing on stage alone: "I found myself hopelessly lost as a solo number. I had no training for dancing alone and I should never have tried it." Though successful with critics, the revue failed to attract an audience; at least not enough of one to pay for the lavish production. Castle's specialty song was challenged on copyright grounds, and management cut it. In addition, her act in the show was scheduled for late in the evening, which conflicted with her early morning film work. As the show failed, she and others were let go by the producers. She later sued successfully, but by then the production company was bankrupt. For the rest of 1917, she made well-received appearances on behalf of war charities.

On 15 February 1918, over Benbrook Field, a training field near Fort Worth, Texas, Vernon took emergency action shortly after takeoff to avoid a collision with another aircraft. His plane stalled, and he was unable to recover control before the plane hit the ground. He died soon after the crash, aged 30. Vernon was the only casualty. According to the monument at the crash site, "Neither the other pilot, his student cadet, nor Vernon's pet monkey, Jeffrey, were seriously injured." Irene paid tribute to Vernon in her memoir My Husband, 1919. There is a street in Benbrook, Texas, named in his honor, with a monument dedicated to him. Vernon was buried in Woodlawn Cemetery in the Bronx, New York. The grieving memorial figure kneeling on the grave was created by Irene's friend, the American sculptor Sally James Farnham.

== Irene's further marriages and later years ==
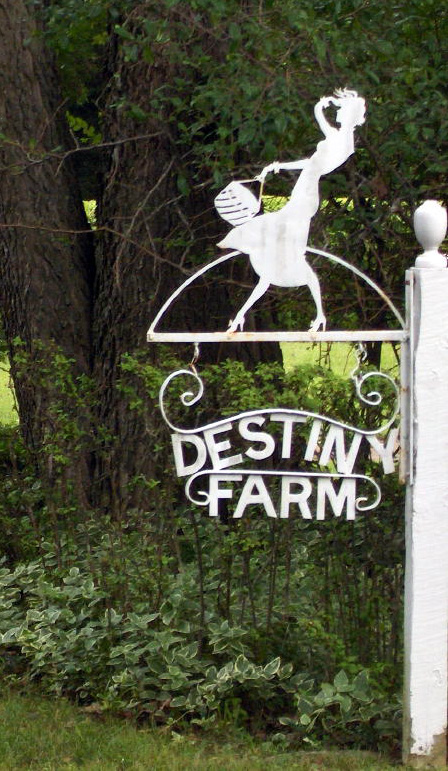
Sign designed by Irene Castle for Destiny Farm in Eureka Springs

On 3 May 1919, Irene married Robert E. Treman, the scion of a prominent Ithaca, New York family. They resided in Ithaca's newly cut Cayuga Heights subdivision, north of Cornell University. Irene starred in about a dozen silent films between 1917 and 1924, including Patria (1917), and appeared in several more stage productions before retiring from show business. Treman reportedly invested Castle's money and lost it in the stock market. They divorced in 1923. She married two more times; the same year, she married Frederic McLaughlin (a man 16 years her elder), and two years after he died in 1944, she married George Enzinger, an advertising executive from Chicago, who died in 1959. During her marriage to "Major" McLaughlin, who was the founding owner of the Chicago Blackhawks, she is credited with designing the original sweater for the Blackhawks Hockey Club. She had two children with McLaughlin, Barbara McLaughlin Kreutz (1925–2003), who became Dean of the Graduate School of Arts and Sciences at Bryn Mawr College, and William Foote McLaughlin (1929–2012).

Around 1930, "the best-dressed woman in America" presented serialized, quarter-hour radio dramatizations of her European travels with her husband, bulldog Zowie, and Walter ("father's coloured servant") around the capitals of Europe in "The Life of Irene Castle". Only one episode (episode #4) is known to exist. In 1939, the Castles' lives were turned into a movie, The Story of Vernon and Irene Castle, produced by RKO and starring Fred Astaire and Ginger Rogers. Edna May Oliver played their agent, and Lew Fields was his 33 years younger self. Irene Castle served as a technical advisor on the film, but clashed with Rogers, who refused to wear Castle's trademark short bob or darken her hair. She objected to Rogers' inauthentic wardrobe demands, although a number of Castle's original Lucile gowns were copied for the movie. Castle also protested the hiring of white actor Walter Brennan to play their faithful friend and manservant Walter, who was black. In 1958, she appeared as a guest challenger on the TV panel show To Tell the Truth.

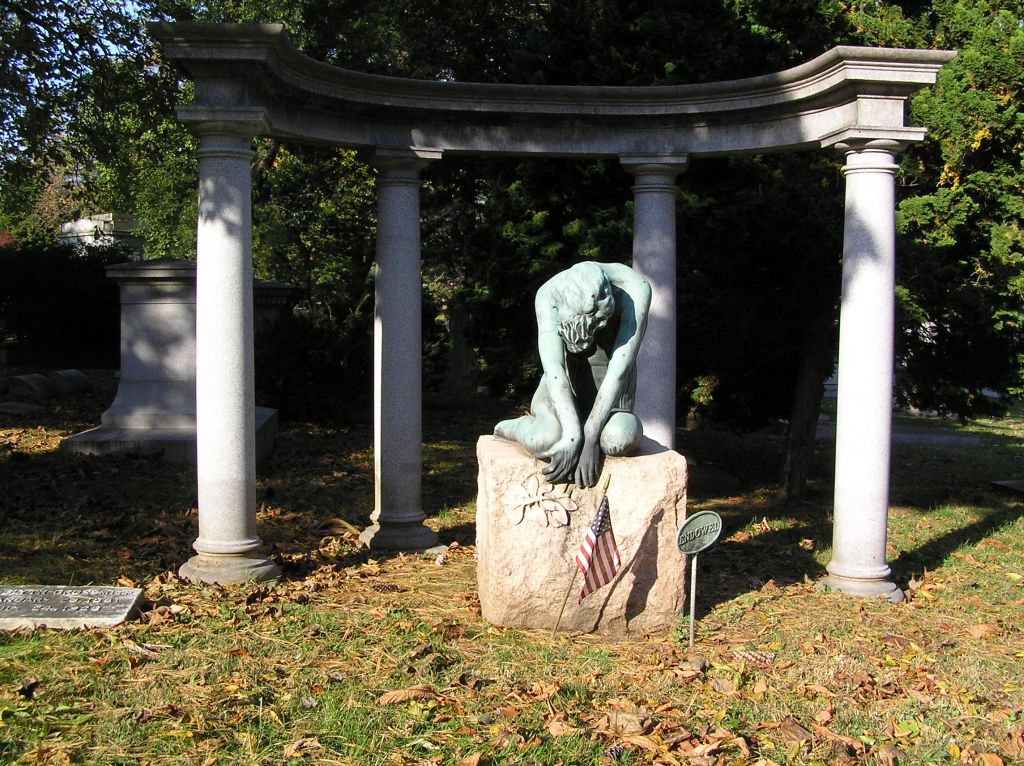
Vernon and Irene Castles' grave

Castle and her fourth husband moved to Destiny Farm in Eureka Springs, Arkansas, in 1954.

=== Animal welfare ===
By the 1920s, and for the rest of her life, Castle was a staunch activist for animal welfare and anti-vivisection. She spoke at events for the Maryland and New York Anti-Vivisection societies. In 1931, she called for the arrest of her neighbour William Schroeder, a pig farmer, on charges of cruelty to his animals. In response, Schroeder filed false-arrest charges of $10,000 against her. She won the case two years later. She founded the Riverwoods, Illinois, animal shelter "Orphans of the Storm" in 1928, which was still active as of 2025.

=== Death ===
Irene died at her Arkansas farm on 25 January 1969, aged 75. She was interred with Vernon at Woodlawn Cemetery in New York City.

== Gallery ==
Irene Castle modeling fashions of 1916–1917

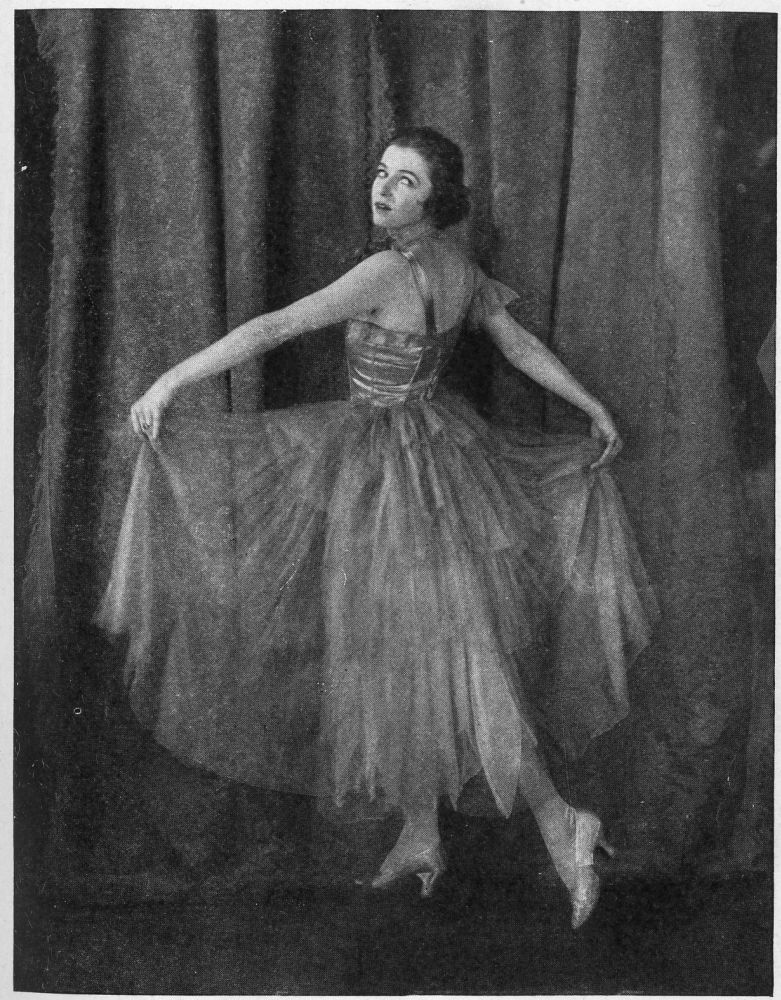
Ball costume

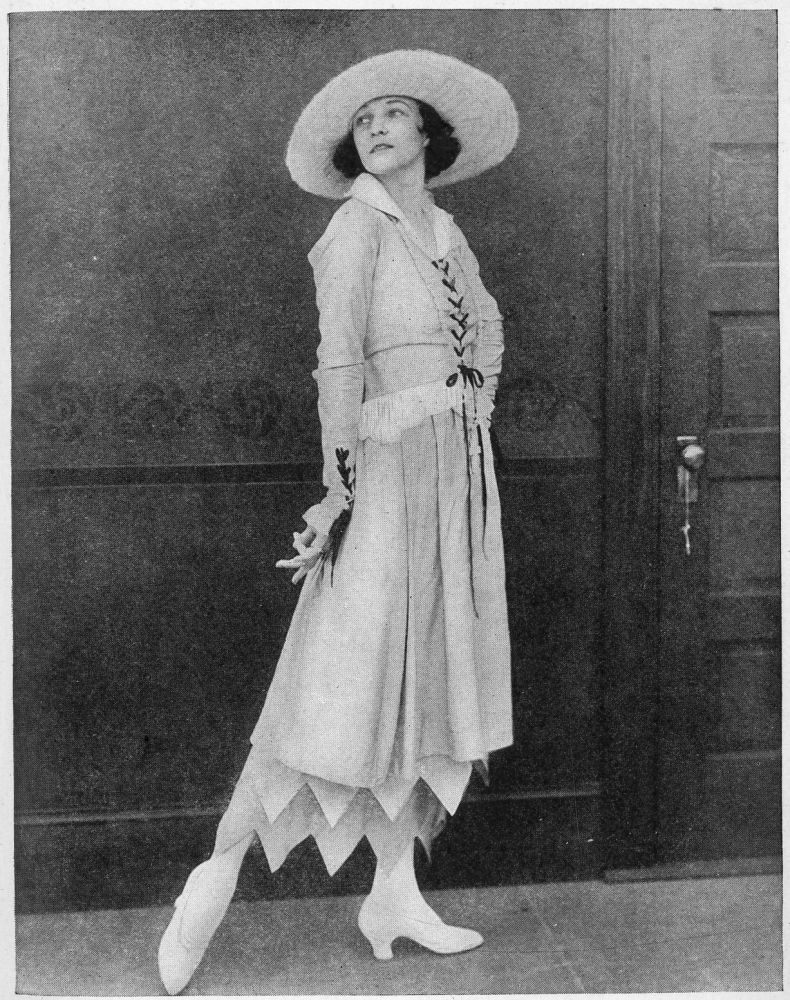
Summer afternoon costume

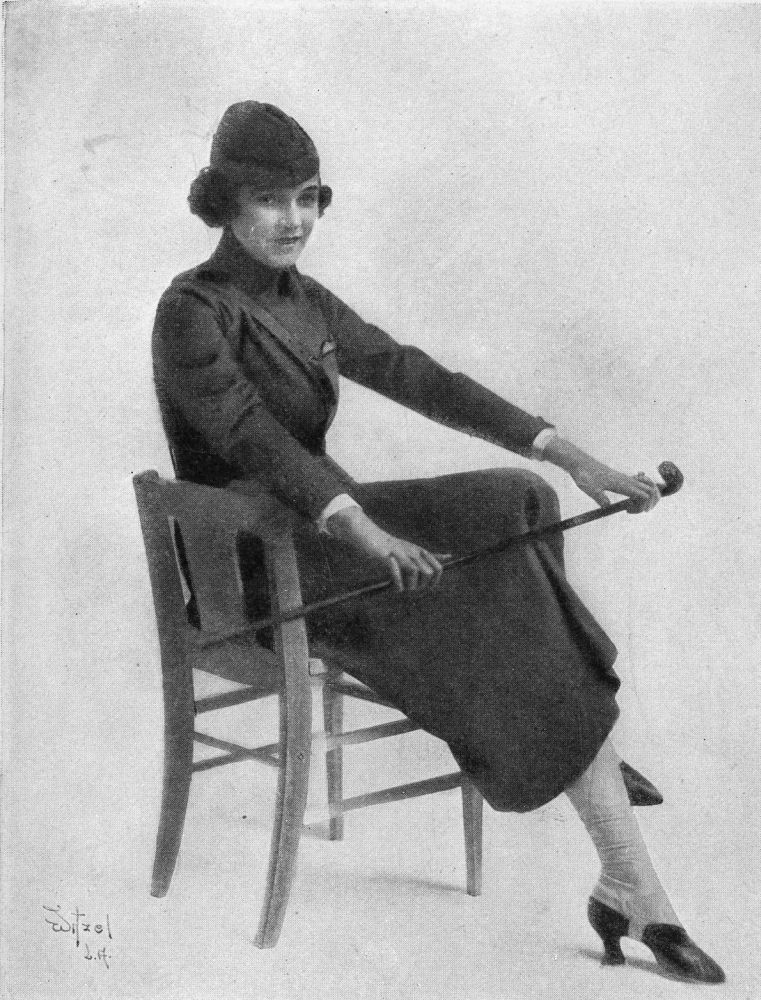
Costumed à la guerre for Patria (1917)

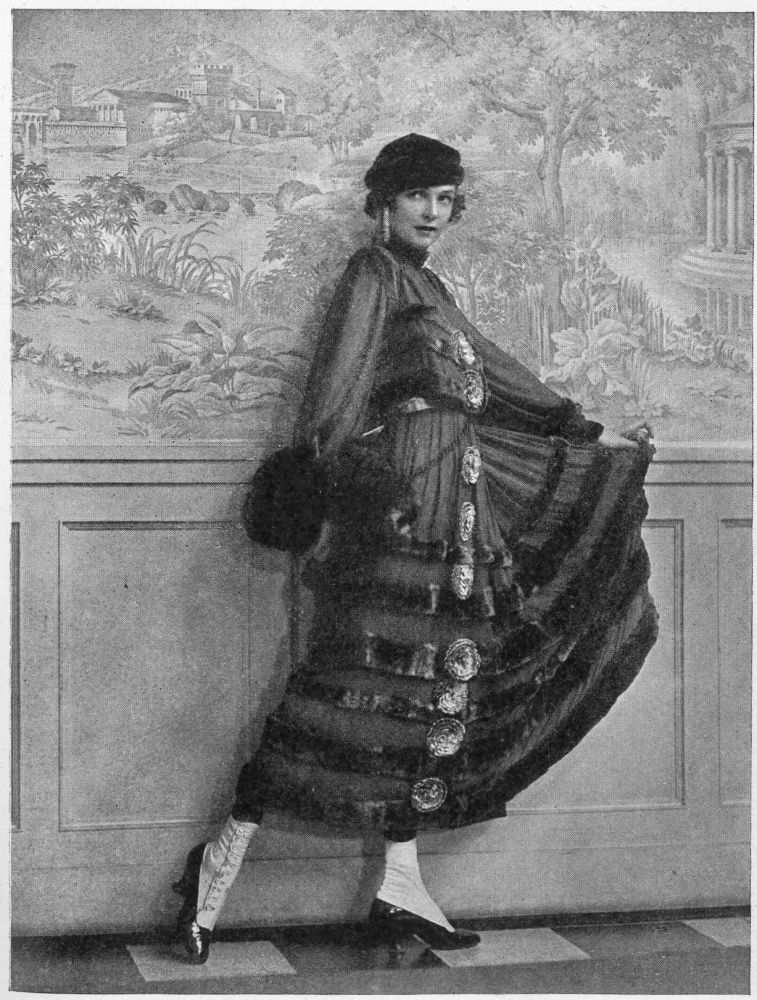
Winter afternoon costume

"Mrs. Vernon Castle who set to-day's fashion in outline of costume and short hair for the young woman of America. For this reason and because Mrs. Castle has form to a superlative degree (correct carriage of the body) and the clothes sense (knowledge of what she can wear and how to wear it) we have selected her to illustrate several types of costumes, characteristic of 1916 and 1917." – Emily Burbank, Woman as Decoration (1917)

== Associated dances ==
- Bunny hug
- Castle Walk
- Foxtrot
- Grizzly Bear
- Hesitation Waltz
- Maxixe
- Tango
- Turkey Trot

== Filmography of Irene Castle ==
| Year | Title | Role | Notes |
|---|---|---|---|
| 1915 | The Whirl of Life | Self | |
| 1917 | Patria | Patria Channing/Elanie | Credited as Mrs. Vernon Castle (role #2), partially lost film |
| 1917 | Stranded in Arcady | Lucy Millington | Credited as Mrs. Vernon Castle, lost film |
| 1917 | The Mark of Cain | Alice | Credited as Mrs. Vernon Castle |
| 1917 | Sylvia of the Secret Service | Sylvia Carroll | Lost film |
| 1917 | Vengeance Is Mine | Paula Farrington | Lost film |
| 1918 | Convict 993 | Roslyn Ayre | Lost film |
| 1918 | The Hillcrest Mystery | Marion Sterling | Lost film |
| 1918 | The Mysterious Client | Jeanne Darcy | Lost film |
| 1918 | The First Law | Norma Webb | |
| 1918 | The Girl from Bohemia | Alice Paige | Lost film |
| 1919 | The Common Cause | France (prologue) | Lost film |
| 1919 | The Firing Line | Sheila Cardross Malcourt | Lost film |
| 1919 | The Invisible Bond | Marcia Crossey | Lost film |
| 1920 | The Amateur Wife | Justine Spencer | Lost film |
| 1922 | The Broadway Bride | Role unconfirmed | Lost film |
| 1922 | French Heels | Palma May | Lost film |
| 1922 | No Trespassing | Mabel Colton | Lost film |
| 1922 | Slim Shoulders | Naomi Warren | Lost film |

== Filmography of Vernon Castle ==
| Year | Title | Role | Notes |
|---|---|---|---|
| 1915 | The Whirl of Life | Self | |

== See also ==
- List of dancers
