= Animal dance =

Early 20th-century American dance craze

The Animal Dance craze was directly related to the popularity of ragtime music (improvisational melodies with syncopated beats, from African-American traditions). There were an endless varieties of animal dance fads, such as: Horse Trot, Kangaroo Hop, Duck Waddle, Squirrel, Chicken Scratch, Turkey Trot, and Grizzly Bear. The general idea of these dances was that dancing couples were supposed to imitate with their own movements the movements of various animals after which the dances were named.

Both music and dance reflected the vibrancy of modern, urban influences. The music is typified by Scott Joplin’s rags and made popular to the middle class by "Alexander's Ragtime Band,” published in 1911. The dances incorporated in the Animal Craze are parts of the Jazz Age of the 1920s.
