= Bunny Dips Into Society =

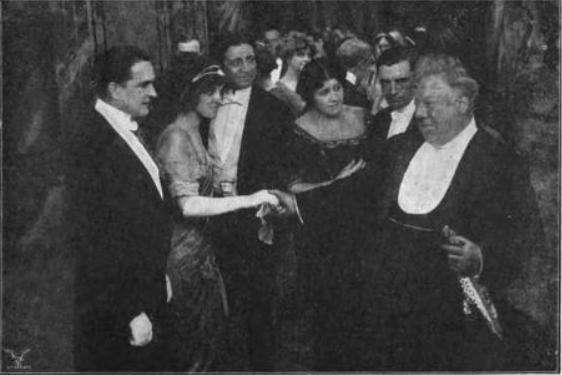
- Directed by: Wilfrid North
- Written by: K.W. Hood
- Starring: John Bunny; Earle Williams; Leah Baird
- Distributed by: Vitagraph
- Release date: May 17, 1913
- Running time: 1,030 ft
- Country: United States
- Languages: Silent; English intertitles

Bunny Dips Into Society, also known as Bunny and the Bunny Hug, is a short American silent comedy film.

== Plot summary ==
A poor but gregarious Irish nightwatchman is falsely introduced as a count at a society ball. He proved to be very popular, especially with the ladies. In one sequence, Bunny performs a (at the time) new and popular dance, the Bunny Hug.

== Release ==
Bunny Dips Into Society was released on May 17, 1913, in the United States, where it was presented as a split-reel with another Vitagraph comedy, Three to One. It was released in London on August 25, 1913, and was still circulating on the British mainland in late February, 1914. It accompanied Selig's production Wamba, a Child of the Jungle when that film screened in New Zealand.

The film has survived and was presented, with live musical accompaniment by Ben Model at the Museum of Modern Art in New York.
