= Watch Your Step (musical) =

Musical by Irving Berlin and Harry B. Smith

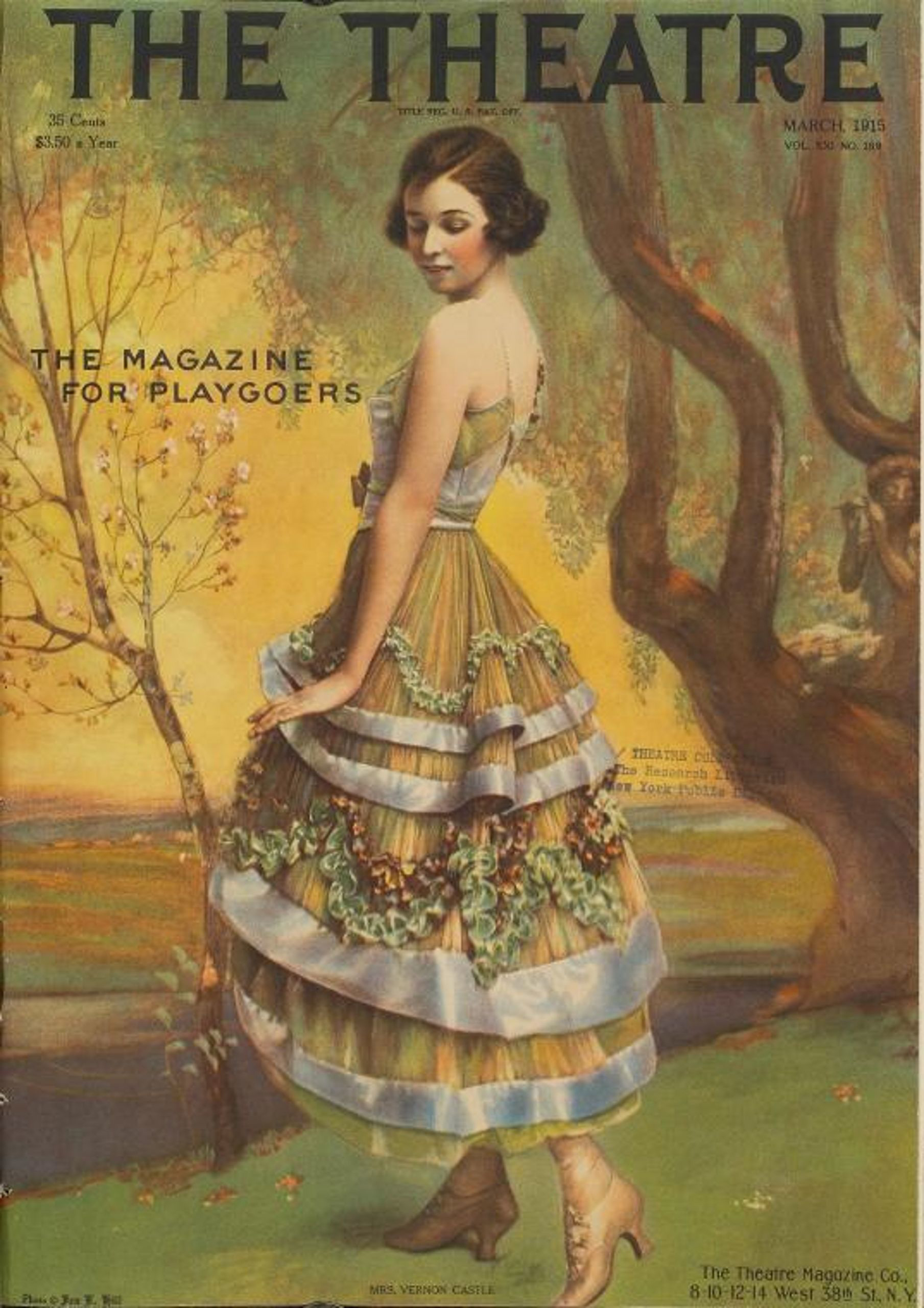
- Irene Castle on the March 1915 cover of Theatre Magazine, in a costume by Lucile for Watch Your Step
- Music: Irving Berlin
- Lyrics: Irving Berlin
- Book: Harry B. Smith
- Productions: 1914 Broadway

Watch Your Step is a musical with music and lyrics by Irving Berlin and a book by Harry B. Smith. Set over the course of one day in New York City, the musical takes place after the death of a wealthy man who leaves his fortune to whichever relative has never been in love and never been kissed. Each hopeful heir plots to get their competitors involved in "damaging affairs".

Watch Your Step was Irving Berlin's first musical, and it marked the first time a Tin Pan Alley composer moved "uptown" to Broadway with a complete score. The songs "Play a Simple Melody" and "They Always Follow Me Around" as well as "When I Discovered You" and "The Syncopated Walk" were introduced by this musical. A highlight of the show was the Act II Finale, "Opera in Modern Time", in which melodies from famous operas were turned into popular dances of the time. The Ghost of Giuseppe Verdi then appeared to protest the ragging of his Rigoletto to no avail.

== Productions ==
The Broadway premiere, produced by Charles Dillingham, opened at the New Amsterdam Theatre on December 8, 1914. It ran for 175 performances and featured in the cast Vernon and Irene Castle, Frank Tinney, Elizabeth Murray, Harry Kelly and Justine Johnstone.
