= Grizzly Bear (dance) =

Early 20th-century American couple dance known as the Grizzly Bear

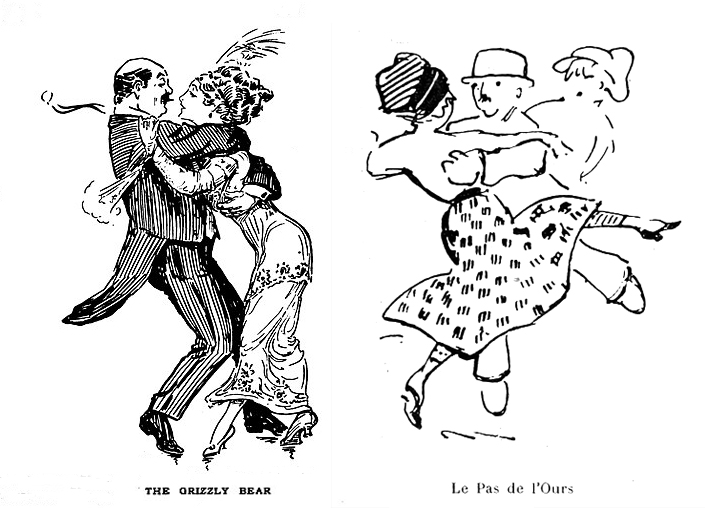
Caricatures of two versions of the dance in 1912: the American and bourgeois grizzly bear on the left, and the French and popular pas de l'ours on the right.

The pas de l'ours, first known by its English name grizzly bear, is a couple dance that emerged in the United States around 1910 and achieved international popularity until the outbreak of the First World War. Its name refers to a stylized and parodic imitation of the swaying gait of a grizzly bear, as well as to the close embrace of the dancers and movements likened to the animal's paws. Performed to ragtime music, the pas de l'ours belongs to a group of early 20th-century American animal dances that shared a taste for fantasy and marked a departure from established social dance conventions. Characterized by syncopated movements, improvisation, and a playful tone, the dance quickly attracted a wide audience. At the same time, it provoked controversy: critics associated its movements with moral laxity, viewed animal imitation as a form of regression, and, in some cases, called for restrictions or bans on public performances. Such reactions were often reinforced by claims that the dance originated in African American communities of the San Francisco underworld. As a result, the pas de l'ours was frequently described as vulgar, a label that sometimes carried racial connotations.

From 1911 onward, several songs by Irving Berlin, notably The Dance of the Grizzly Bear and Everybody's Doin' It Now, played a significant role in popularizing the dance. It initially spread among young immigrants, for whom it could serve as an expression of American identity, before being taken up by high society, which often regarded it as a novelty. Beginning in 1912, this popularity prompted opposition from reform movements, particularly those concerned with safeguarding young women from perceived moral risks. In parallel, dance professionals such as Vernon and Irene Castle promoted efforts to standardize and refine ragtime dances, seeking to remove elements they considered excessive—features that were nonetheless central to the character of the pas de l'ours.

In 1912, the pas de l'ours also gained visibility in France as part of a broader enthusiasm for new dances, supported by performers such as Gaby Deslys and Mistinguett. It was adopted by Parisian high society, which often appreciated its comic aspects, as well as by working-class environments and avant-garde artistic circles. This reception took place within a context of American cultural fascination that included admiration for African American figures such as boxer Jack Johnson, who enjoyed considerable notoriety in Paris at the time. Contemporary film productions provide evidence of this enthusiasm. These varied forms of appropriation of a dance perceived as exotic were interrupted by the First World War but anticipated developments that would later reappear after the armistice, particularly during the vogue of the Foxtrot and the tango.

== Ragtime dances ==
Maple Leaf Rag by Scott Joplin in an orchestral version recorded in 1906.

The grizzly bear was one of several dances practiced in the United States between about 1910 and 1913 to ragtime music, a term that originally referred to "ragged time". These dances belonged to the category of closed-couple dances, in which partners remained in physical contact, holding one another with both hands or arms.

Ragtime is characterized by syncopation, displaced accents, and rhythmic shifts set against a steady bass pattern. This rhythmic structure influenced the dances performed to it, which were generally based on walking steps that allowed for numerous variations. Dancers could play with the musical structure through foot placement and bodily accents, modify their speed of execution while moving, or introduce visible contrasts to the regular bass line through movements of the arms, shoulders, and hips.

The emergence of ragtime dances followed the diffusion of ragtime music beyond African American communities during the first decade of the 20th century, particularly into venues associated with popular entertainment and nightlife. This spread was accelerated by music hall performances, including minstrel shows. Reconstructing ragtime dances as they were originally practiced by popular audiences is difficult. Rather than existing as a single fixed or authentic form, these dances were generally spontaneous, evolving, and informal, marked by playfulness and by early hybridization that combined elements of African American cultural practices with influences from European traditions. Dance terminology was not standardized during this period. A step referred to as the grizzly bear in one city might be called the turkey trot or bunny hug in another, with these terms sometimes used interchangeably for the one-step.

An article published in the St. Louis Post-Dispatch in December 1911 compared the grizzly bear to belly dance (then referred to as hoochie coochie) and highlighted features associated with the animal from which the dance took its name, including swaying hips, steps performed with the feet turned outward, and a "bear-like embrace". Another article from the Richmond Palladium, also published in December 1911, suggested that the name grizzly bear could be misleading, as it implied a "hugging match", even though the dance could, in principle, be performed in a restrained manner. The article nonetheless identified bodily movement as a central concern, particularly lateral hip oscillations and forward rocking of the torso and abdomen.

In the same month, Marguerite Moers Marshall, writing in The Evening World, similarly argued that the grizzly bear might be danced in a socially acceptable way, but criticized the close physical proximity of some couples, their lateral hip movements, forward thrusting of the torso or abdomen beyond a normal posture, and wriggling of the trunk, which she described as giving the dance an indecorous character. Other articles adopted a more ironic tone. According to the Chicago Inter Ocean, dancers simply embraced, spun, and wriggled body to body in time with the music, likening themselves to a captive grizzly bear. For The Baltimore Sun, the grizzly bear was described less as a dance than as a wrestling match, in which each partner maneuvered to control the other through various holds.

== Animal dances ==
The grizzly bear and other ragtime dance steps popular in the United States in the years preceding the country's entry into the First World War are commonly grouped under the label animal dances, a term derived from the animal names assigned to them. This group includes dances such as the turkey trot, the bunny hug, the monkey glide, the horse trot, the crab step, the possum trot, the bullfrog hop, the fish walk, the snake dip, the eagle rock, the chicken scratch, the kangaroo kant, and the wiggle worm. The breadth of this repertoire has been described as a "zoo", reflecting both the popularity of such dances and the rapid turnover of fashionable steps presented as new variations.

The animal-based names primarily reflect the imitative and playful qualities of the dances. In the case of the grizzly bear, this imitation involved movements associated with a bear, including pronounced lateral swaying, bent knees, a close embrace with partners positioned chest to chest and arms resting loosely on one another's shoulders, and the curling of the fingers to suggest claws.

Many historians interpret the emergence of the grizzly bear and animal dances more generally as the outcome of a dual process of hybridization. On the one hand, changes in African American social practices associated with urbanization, migration to the Northeastern United States, and the transformation of leisure venues contributed to shifts in dance style, including a more upright posture, abandonment of barefoot dancing, increased individualization of movement, and heightened sexual connotations of gestures. Through contact with European dances, notably the waltz, African American dance forms incorporated reduced emphasis on contact with the ground and a stiffer torso, while maintaining a strong role for improvisation in adapted versions. On the other hand, white dancers simultaneously appropriated selected elements of African American dances, particularly through practices such as slumming, which transformed African American dance venues into destinations for white audiences and encouraged proprietors to adapt performances to the expectations of this clientele. Scholars have noted that, during this period, African American music and dance were widely appropriated by white-controlled entertainment industries, while Black performers were often excluded from recognition and economic benefit. Instructors who codified or "sanitized" animal dances were frequently credited as their creators, whereas the Black dancers who transmitted these practices remained largely unacknowledged. As Éliane Seguin observes, moreover, the stigmatization of ragtime dances as immoral or obscene, and their association with African American culture, does not necessarily imply a dominant African American origin; at the time, even limited elements drawn from Black culture were sufficient, under the one-drop rule, for dances to be perceived as "Black dances".

== Social changes ==
Several authors, following Kathy Peiss, situate animal dances in general, and the grizzly bear in particular, within broader changes in social dancing practices in the United States from the late 19th century onward. These changes accompanied the rise of a culture of dance halls (dance-hall), which offered young wage-earning women new opportunities for social interaction outside family and neighborhood networks and contributed to evolving attitudes toward leisure, sexuality, and personal fulfillment.

These new forms of entertainment, less constrained by kinship ties and traditional supervision, were encouraged by the spread of collective housing (tenements) and by the emergence of rackets, clubs or amusement societies operated for profit through alcohol sales and characterized by limited oversight of admissions. Their popularity led to the multiplication of increasingly large dance halls, which often functioned as dance academies during the day and hosted social events in the evenings and on Sundays. Unlike earlier social settings, these venues did not promote intergenerational mixing and instead relied on instructors who demonstrated the latest fashionable steps.

The expansion of such dance halls, where young women of modest means were admitted at reduced prices and where comparatively relaxed moral codes prevailed, was viewed with concern by observers from higher social classes. Within a broader media climate marked by anxiety over the so-called white slavery, these venues were often portrayed as encouraging prostitution. This moral panic contributed to the passage of the Mann Act in 1910.

Although the waltz, widely regarded as a marker of respectability and subject to careful codification, was among the dances taught in these academies, and although the dances performed in dance halls by working-class women were derived from it, their execution often differed substantially from the formal model.

Young women dancing in these venues generally did not adhere to the aesthetic ideals associated with the waltz, such as grace, elegance, and refinement. Instead, they favored the spiel, a slang term designating a closely embraced couple turning and moving in small circles. The posture of spiel dancers contrasted with that of waltzers, often appearing rigid, particularly in the leading arm, which was thrust forward rather than held in a rounded frame. Female practitioners were known as spielers, a term attested from the late 19th century and originally used to describe a street dance performed to the accompaniment of a barrel organ.

A 1908 investigation of New York dance halls commissioned by Belle Moskowitz described the spiel as a vulgar form of dancing involving extensive bodily twisting and spinning and producing sexual excitement. The male partners of spiel dancers were commonly referred to as toughs.

Following the emergence of spieling and pivoting, the dances practiced in dance halls, often grouped under the label tough dances, continued to evolve according to dancers' preferences, incorporating elements from the waltz, the polka, and the cancan. The 1902 documentary short A Tough Dance on the Bowery supports contemporary descriptions of early 20th-century tough dancing, which emphasized close bodily contact and improvised movements that departed from middle-class dance conventions.

From about 1905 onward, the term tough dances gradually came to overlap in meaning with animal dances, the former highlighting the social identity of the dancers and the latter referring to the naming conventions of the dances themselves. According to Christopher Tremewan Martin, the charge of vulgarity often directed at these dances carried a racialized implication and functioned as an indirect reference to their presumed African American origins.

Lewis Erenberg emphasizes that the appeal of animal dances lay largely in the incorporation of additional bodily movements, such as shoulder shrugs, finger snapping, or forward-leaning gestures synchronized with the music, which offered dancers immediate physical pleasure and contrasted with the repetitiveness of codified professional steps. He argues that by incorporating movements previously considered unacceptable, these modern dances contributed to the formation of new expressions of femininity, facilitated greater ease between partners, expanded the range of acceptable bodily contact, and symbolized shifting values surrounding heterosexual interaction.

== Role of Irving Berlin ==
In 1910, the composer George Botsford published the Grizzly Bear Rag. His publisher, Ted Snyder, subsequently asked Irving Berlin to write lyrics for a vocal version, which involved only minor melodic modifications. The resulting song, entitled The Dance of the Grizzly Bear, was issued in sheet-music form alongside the original piano-only composition.

The vocal version achieved substantial commercial success, reportedly selling around one million copies. Its popularity contributed to the rapid dissemination of the dance itself.

The lyrics, which humorously evoke the intense excitement generated by the grizzly bear, attest to the notoriety of the dance at an early stage. The opening verses refer to its San Francisco origins, while the refrain emphasizes characteristic elements such as a close embrace (hugged up) and upward shoulder movements. Berlin's text repeatedly alludes to bodily proximity, including tightly holding one's partner ("Hug up close to your baby") and reclining together ("Close your eyes and do some nappin'"), with imagery suggesting drowsiness or hypnotic abandon.

The song's language and imagery are also marked by racialized elements. Although it presents itself as "not so coony", a reference distancing it from the coon song genre that caricatured Black people, the use of dialect spellings (such as yo' for your, his'n for his, and gwine for going) and recurring terms like honey and baby situate it within similar representational conventions. Contemporary critics of both the song and the dance interpreted these features as signs of moral transgression and, in some cases, as evidence of a perceived regression to African or African American sexual practices.

Despite such criticisms, the song was quickly incorporated into the repertoires of prominent performers, including Sophie Tucker, who was briefly arrested in Portland after a performance deemed immoral by a women's safety official, and Maud Raymond, both of whom featured it in their vaudeville acts. It was later revived in the Ziegfeld Follies by Fanny Brice and recorded in July 1910 by Stella Mayhew for Edison.

Several authors have observed that these performers were Jewish women often grouped under the label of coon shouters. In scholarship, they are described as figures who challenged prevailing boundaries of race and gender in popular entertainment, compensating for limited formal musical training through eclectic vocal techniques, stylized bodily gestures, and theatrical costuming. Their performances frequently drew on stereotyped representations associated with Blackness, including linguistic affectations and dance steps derived from the cakewalk.

In 1911, building on the success of animal dances, Irving Berlin published Everybody's Doin' It Now. The song is often described as encapsulating both the popularity of these dances and the sense of vitality and sexual freedom associated with them. The refrain's concluding line, "It's a bear!", repeated three times and inspired by the dance of the same name, was reportedly suggested during the composition process by the younger sister of lyricist E. Ray Goetz, who accompanied her suggestion with a dance movement.

The song quickly became emblematic of the new dance craze. It accompanied a dance number interpolated into the musical comedy Over the River, staged at New York's Globe Theatre in early 1912. During the refrain, the phrase "It's a bear!" was repeated, while dancers mimicked the swaying gait associated with the animal.

Following Marshall Stearns, several historians have identified this number as the first theatrical presentation of the so-called "bear step". This claim, however, remains debated. Stearns dated the performance to 1910 rather than 1912, and other evidence indicates that a version of the dance had already been incorporated into a revue at the Folies Bergère in New York in 1911.

== Crackdown in dance halls ==
The popularity of Irving Berlin's song and its repeated use in music-hall performances contributed to the wider public adoption of ragtime dances, particularly the grizzly bear and the turkey trot. This rapid diffusion also provoked concern and resistance among segments of the social elite. Contemporary press accounts illustrate the speed with which these dances moved from working-class venues into elite social settings. In December 1911, for example, reports noted that the turkey trot had been taken up by members of Philadelphia high society, only for the same circles to announce bans on the turkey trot and the grizzly bear a few weeks later. Similar prohibitions were introduced at prominent venues in New York City, New Haven, and elsewhere, and some dance halls attempted to limit outside scrutiny by excluding journalists.

Opposition to the grizzly bear and related animal dances developed as part of a broader reform movement concerned with the protection of young women who frequented dance halls. Reformers associated these venues with alcohol consumption and, more generally, with the perceived risk of prostitution. A central figure in this campaign was social activist Belle Moskowitz, who coordinated investigations and public discussions on the regulation of commercial dance spaces.

The campaign began in 1908 with a study of New York City dance halls commissioned by Moskowitz and carried out by Julia Schoenfeld. The investigation examined the relationship between dancing, alcohol sales, and other activities tolerated in some establishments, including gambling and prostitution. In the following years, Moskowitz organized press conferences, published articles, and delivered public lectures advocating the creation of "model dance halls", free from incentives to excessive drinking and sexual exploitation, as well as the licensing and regulation of other venues.

In January 1912, a committee chaired by Moskowitz issued a report on standards of decency in social dancing. The report raised questions about whether dances such as the grizzly bear and the turkey trot posed a threat to public morals and whether a distinction could be drawn between forms allegedly originating in disreputable venues and those practiced in elite ballrooms. The committee maintained that its objective was not to condemn social dancing as such, but to target what it described as "indecent buffooneries", distinguishing these from "legitimate dancing".

To support these claims, investigators continued to observe dancing in both high-society settings and popular dance halls. Their reports emphasized bodily proximity, improvised movements, and, in some cases, overtly provocative behavior. Descriptions included dancers extending their arms in imitation of claws, exaggerated swaying or rubbing motions, and performances accompanied by Berlin's songs, which were frequently cited as emblematic of the new dance craze.

In January 1912, Moskowitz convened a conference attended by several hundred participants to discuss "standards of decency" in dance. Professional dancers, including Oscar Duryea and Al Jolson, demonstrated how ragtime dances could progress from restrained movements to more intimate embraces. Some speakers argued that even socially refined versions of the grizzly bear should be abandoned, while others presented alternative dances inspired by classical or folk traditions as more acceptable models. Jolson, in particular, offered a retrospective explanation of the grizzly bear, portraying it as an awkward adaptation of established couple dances by inexperienced dancers in San Francisco venues.

These reform efforts coincided with initiatives by professional dancers such as Vernon and Irene Castle, Maurice Mouvet, and Florence Walton, who sought to "refine" and standardize popular dances that critics had labeled ugly. Their approach was disseminated through illustrated newspaper articles, dance manuals, sheet music, and touring theatrical productions. Dance-hall proprietors were also encouraged to participate by agreeing to ban certain dances deemed "immoral" and by restricting particular forms of syncopated music in musicians' contracts, in exchange for recognition as respectable establishments.

== Modernist cleansing ==
An opposition was thus articulated between ragtime dances, particularly the grizzly bear, and what contemporaries described as "modern dancing". This distinction, identified in later scholarship, structured much of the discourse surrounding early twentieth-century social dance and framed debates about taste, propriety, and bodily expression.

Ragtime dances were frequently characterized by an aesthetic of rupture, emphasizing change, contrast, and discontinuity. By contrast, modern dances promoted restraint and continuity, valuing coordinated movement within the couple and alignment between dancers and the musical rhythm.

Ragtime dances engaged the entire body, activating shoulders, hips, limbs, and facial expression. This full-body involvement contributed to perceptions of these dances as heavier and more physically demanding than modern dances. Such movements allowed the torso and limbs to express sensuality and desire more openly, whereas modern dance aesthetics limited bodily articulation, particularly of the torso, and sought to minimize overt sexual expression while presenting an appearance of lightness and playfulness.

The flexible structure of ragtime dances also allowed for improvisation and individual variation, including moments of solo expression. In contrast, modern dance discourse emphasized adherence to standardized forms taught by professional instructors. It reinforced a hierarchical model in which the follower (most often the woman) was expected to respond to the lead of the partner (most often the man) and, more generally, to conform to prescribed techniques.

Improvisation and rhythmic breaks were therefore more prominent in ragtime dances, which foregrounded individuality and variation. Modern dances, by comparison, aimed to balance pleasure with control, sensual expression with decorum, and innovation with a rapid return to restraint. This balance was often articulated through clearly defined gender roles and choreographic structures.

More broadly, ragtime dances were shaped by strong influences from African American dance traditions, while also reflecting processes of cultural hybridization that incorporated practices from diverse social and ethnic backgrounds, including those of European immigrants. Within this context, the process of "refinement" promoted by professional dancers sought to remove elements perceived as excessive or improper, such as pronounced hip movements, overt sexual references, or animal imitation, in order to render these dances compatible with prevailing middle-class norms.

== Acclimatization in France ==
The grizzly bear reached Europe as early as 1911. It was documented in London during the summer, in connection with a tour by Irving Berlin, which contributed to renewed interest in the Grizzly Bear Rag in musical comedy. From July onward, the dance featured prominently in the performances of the American actress Ethel Levey at the Alhambra Theatre. Her solo number, entitled Grizzly Bear, attracted considerable attention from critics, who commented on the novelty and visual impact of her interpretation. Contemporary observers described her performance as strikingly modern in appearance and movement, though some suggested that British audiences did not fully appreciate her style.

Levey's reception in Paris the following year was similarly enthusiastic. Appearing with musicians presented in the press as an African American ensemble from New York, she drew favorable comparisons with other popular performers of the period, including Gaby Deslys. French critics emphasized the contrast between Levey's energetic and expressive approach and what they regarded as more conventional or repetitive versions of the bear dance presented in other revues. Several reviewers highlighted the physical intensity of her performance and its distinctive visual character.

During the spring of 1912, the bear dance became a recurrent feature of Parisian music-hall programs. Among the earliest successful interpretations was that of Jane Marnac and Gaston Silvestre, whose version was widely praised and reportedly demanded significant physical exertion from the performers. Contemporary accounts noted that the effort required by the dance sometimes made repeated encores difficult.

In March 1912, the American dance partners Vernon and Irene Castle appeared at the Olympia in the revue Enfin... une Revue!. Performing to Alexander's Ragtime Band, they presented their own interpretation of the grizzly bear. At the time, their knowledge of the dance was limited to press descriptions, and they assumed that Parisian audiences would be similarly unfamiliar with its established forms. The success of their performance led to an engagement at the Café de Paris and played a significant role in establishing their reputation. This Parisian reception laid the groundwork for the prominence they would later achieve after returning to the United States.

== "Theorization" of the dance ==
Analyzing the rapid expansion of social dance in the United States during the 1910s, Danielle Robinson argues that this development was partly driven by the commodification of dance by professionals, who drew on methods of mass production and rationalization associated with Taylorism. In this perspective, the originally improvised character of the bear step posed a challenge to commodification, particularly in the context of dance instruction. The process instead required choreographic codification, detailed written description, and formalized teaching methods. These requirements brought about substantial transformations of the dance and were accompanied by recurring critiques of earlier improvisational practices in contemporary manuals. The resulting changes included a simplification of dance structures, a reduction in their number to facilitate more efficient learning, and the reuse of shared elements across multiple variants.

This interpretation converges with that of Felicia McCarren, who emphasizes that Taylorist principles appealed to dance professionals through their focus on identifying an "essential" gesture associated with optimal speed and on coordinating groups of performers. Both aspects involved subordinating the individual rhythm and creativity of dancers to an overall effect, producing a form of internalization of mechanical movement.

In France, after an initial period of resistance from some professionals, the newly introduced dances became the subject of new forms of appropriation. Their instruction increasingly took place in dance classes, which multiplied alongside the broader democratization of social dancing. Within this context, competing schools or "academies" asserted their authority and promoted distinct approaches to teaching.

Material supports, often associated with the names of prominent instructors, further contributed to the development of this market. These supports included studio photographs of professional dancers, written theories outlining instructional methods, explanatory diagrams, and in some cases musical scores. Together, they formed part of a growing infrastructure intended to standardize and disseminate dance knowledge.

The reliance on these supports, which were intended to replace traditional oral and demonstrative transmission, revealed the difficulty of clearly conveying dance practices through text and images alone. Descriptions often focused primarily on the gentleman's steps, accompanied by brief indications that the woman performed the same movements on the opposite foot. In some cases, the explanation of simple steps required lengthy but still incomplete descriptions. Even when supplemented by symbolic systems based on footprints, these representations frequently proved ambiguous.

Rather than enabling individuals to learn dances independently, such schematic representations appear to have served other functions. They contributed to moral regulation by specifying acceptable distances between partners and participated more broadly in a visual culture that promoted the rationalization and standardization of bodily movement.

== Influence ==
Although the popularity of the bear step was relatively brief, due in part to the emergence of the tango and the disruption caused by the World War I, its impact in France extended beyond the period of its widespread practice. Its presence in artistic production indicates the significance attributed to the dance at the time and reflects the cultural values with which it was associated.

=== Painting ===
Dance occupied a central place in the work of the Italian painter Gino Severini. After settling in Paris in 1906, he regularly attended dance halls and music halls, experiences that informed his artistic practice alongside his studio work in Montmartre at the Villa de Guelma. In this environment, he moved among artists such as Suzanne Valadon, Maurice Utrillo, Raoul Dufy, and Georges Braque. Severini participated in the first exhibition of the Futurists in 1912 at the Galerie Bernheim-Jeune, an event associated with the movement's emphasis on modernity, speed, and dynamism, while also drawing on influences from Divisionism and Cubism. Among the works he exhibited were several paintings in which dance was a prominent subject, including La Danse du Pan Pan à Monico, which contributed to his growing reputation.

During the winter of 1912–1913, Severini painted La Danse de l'ours au Moulin Rouge. The work attracted attention in the international press and was widely reproduced. In the catalogue of a London exhibition, Severini described the painting as an attempt to translate musical rhythm into visual form through the interaction of lines, planes, and colors. According to the presentation text at the Centre Pompidou, the painting exemplifies his use of intense colors and sharply angled, dynamic forms intended to convey movement and sensory impact.

In 1913, Severini revisited the theme in another painting that moved further toward abstraction, replacing figurative representation with a composition of vividly colored, rhythmic elements. These works form part of a broader series devoted to the Grizzly Bear dance. In this series, Severini progressively reduced references to specific settings in order to emphasize rhythm, verticality, and the visual suggestion of movement. His approach sought to establish correspondences between sensory experience and formal elements such as line, color, and structure.

The musical context associated with these paintings also extended beyond the visual arts. The Grizzly Bear dance as performed by the dancers Manzano and La Mora in the revue Tais-toi, tu m'affoles at the Moulin Rouge in 1913 was accompanied by Irving Berlin's "That Mysterious Rag". This piece served as a rhythmic reference for Erik Satie in the Ragtime du paquebot from the ballet Parade of 1917, illustrating the circulation of popular dance rhythms across artistic media during the period.

=== Cinema ===
In cinema, the grizzly bear step was frequently associated with boxing. This association first appeared in a short film by Henri Pouctal, released in July 1913, Une aventure de Jack Johnson à Paris. The film belongs to the genre of docufiction and focuses on the boxer Jack Johnson, the world heavyweight champion, who was living in France after being prosecuted in the United States under the Mann Act.

One scene depicts Johnson dancing the grizzly bear step with his wife. Contemporary Parisian newspapers also reported that Johnson performed the dance during boxing exhibitions he staged in the evenings at the Folies Bergère, while filming for Pouctal during the day.

Johnson had already attracted attention in New York in 1911 by combining boxing demonstrations with performances of the grizzly bear step, presenting himself in theatrical advertisements as both a singer and a dancer. In Paris, he also danced the grizzly bear at the Bal Bullier, where he established connections with figures such as Arthur Cravan, Blaise Cendrars, and Sonia and Robert Delaunay. Within avant-garde circles, Johnson was perceived as embodying a fusion of American modernity and ideas of primitivism that challenged prevailing bourgeois norms.

The grizzly bear step also lent its name to a surviving short film in the 9.5 mm format, produced after 1922, which reused footage from the now-lost film Le Roman de Carpentier released in December 1913. In this sequence, the boxer Georges Carpentier dances the step at Maxim's with Mistinguett as his partner.

In this scene, Carpentier moves around his partner in a manner recalling a boxing ring. The sequence illustrates the deliberate construction of what has been described as the "Carpentier effect", based on the presentation of the boxer's elegance and controlled movement, and on a broader strategy of self-promotion that extended beyond sport to include music hall and cinema. It also reflects the rivalry between Gaby Deslys and Mistinguett, both of whom sought to associate themselves with fashionable dances of the period.

The grizzly bear step was also used as a comic motif in films such as Onésime et le Pas de l'ours (1913). This short film belongs to the Onésime series directed by Jean Durand, which is known for its emphasis on exaggerated and absurd situations. The plot follows Onésime as he attempts to win a modern dance competition organized by the Académie des Beaux-Arts by learning the grizzly bear step from a specialist, who is humorously portrayed as an actual Pyrenean bear.

A similar premise appears in Kri Kri e il passo dell'orso, produced by Cines in 1914 and released in France as Patachon et le pas de l'ours, starring Raymond Dandy. In this film, a bear teaches the grizzly bear step to the protagonist.

The Kri Kri (or Patachon) series is characterized by situations that overturn everyday logic, often through the use of special effects. The film belongs to a subgroup of the series sometimes described as "dance-mania comedies", which also includes Kri Kri e il tango (1913) and Kri Kri balla (1915). In these works, the protagonist's compulsive dancing functions as a central organizing device that links scenes and settings and structures the progression of the narrative.

== Legacy ==
The popularity of the "Grizzly Bear" dance (pas de l'ours) declined before the outbreak of World War I, and ragtime dances were largely curtailed during the conflict. After the war, these dances reappeared in a transformed social context shaped by new cultural practices that had emerged during the interwar period, to which the Grizzly Bear had contributed. Gradually displaced by the foxtrot, the Grizzly Bear has persisted primarily as a cultural reference associated with the prewar era. An example appears in the television series Downton Abbey, in which English servants in 1912 attempt to learn the dance using an instructional manual.

The name later reappeared in other cultural contexts. In 1967, the American rock band The Youngbloods released a song titled Grizzly Bear, which was presented as an example of a hybrid style described as "rag 'n' roll", intended to combine elements of 1920s ragtime with contemporary electric music. The song achieved only limited success compared with the earlier works by Botsford and Berlin that had popularized the dance.

== See also ==
- Bunny hug
- Animal dance
- Irving Berlin
- Minstrel show
- Ragtime
- Texas Tommy
- Vernon and Irene Castle

== Bibliography ==
- Irving Lewis Allen (1993). The City in Slang: New York Life and Popular Speech. Oxford University Press.
- Anthony J. Berret (2004). "Basil and the Dance Craze". The F. Scott Fitzgerald Review. 3: 88–107. doi:10.1111/j.1755-6333.2004.tb00006.x. JSTOR 41583072.
- Barbara Naomi Cohen (1980). The Dance Direction of Ned Wayburn: Selected Topics in Musical Staging, 1901-1923. New York University.
- Dale Cockrell (2019). Everybody's Doin' It: Sex, Music, and Dance in New York, 1840-1917. W. W. Norton.
- Michel Fabre; Klaus Benesch, Kerstin Schmidt (2005). "The Ring and the Stage : African Americans in Parisian Public and Imaginary Space before World War I". Space in America : Theory, History, Culture. Rodopi.
- Daniela Fonti (2001). Gino Severini: The Dance 1909-1916. Skira.
- Ellery Foutch (2006). "Dancing in the Street: George Luks's Spielers". Athanor. 24.
- Charles Hamm (1997). Irving Berlin : Songs from the Melting Pot:The Formative Years, 1907-1914. Oxford University Press.
- Sylvie Jacotot (2007). "The Inversion of Social Dance Transfers Between Europe and the Americas at the Turn of the Twentieth Century". Congress on Research in Dance Conference Proceedings. 39: 106–112. doi:10.1017/S2049125500000194.
- Sophie Jacotot (2008). "Danses de société des Amériques en France dans l'entre-deux-guerres : Les mirages de l'exotisme" [American ballroom dancing in France between the wars: The mirages of exoticism]. Hypothèses (in French). 11. doi:10.3917/hyp.071.0057.
- Sophie Jacotot (2010). "Danses modernes" [Modern dances]. In Anne Dulphy; Robert Frank; Marie-Anne Matard-Bonucci; Pascal Ory (eds.). Les relations culturelles internationales au XXe siècle : de la diplomatie culturelle à l'acculturation [International cultural relations in the 20th century: from cultural diplomacy to acculturation] (in French). Peter Lang. ISBN 978-90-5201-661-0.
- Sophie Jacotot (2013). Danser à Paris dans l'entre-deux-guerres : Lieux, pratiques et imaginaires des danses de société des Amériques (1919–1939) [Dancing in Paris between the wars: Places, practices, and imaginaries of social dances from the Americas (1919–1939)] (in French). Nouveau Monde.
- Mark Knowles (2009). The Wicked Waltz and Other Scandalous Dances: Outrage and Couple Dancing in the 19th and Early 20th Centuries. MacFarland. ISBN 978-0-7864-5360-3.
- Julie Malnig (1992). Dancing Till Dawn: A Century of Exhibition Ballroom Dance. Greenwood Press.
- Julie Malnig (1997). "Two-Stepping to Glory: Social Dance and the Rhetoric of Social Mobility". Etnofoor. 10 (1): 128–150. JSTOR 25757912.
- Christopher Tremewan Martin (2010). How the Waltz Has Won: Towards a Waltz Aesthetic. University of Maryland.
- Michel Pastoureau (2013). L'Ours: Histoire d'un roi déchu [The Bear: Story of a Fallen King] (in French). Points.
- Kathy Peiss (1985). Cheap Amusements: Working Women and Leisure in Turn-of-the-Century New York. Temple University Press.
- Elizabeth Israels Perry (1992). Belle Moskowitz: Feminine Politics and the Exercise of Power in the Age of Alfred E. Smith. Routledge.
- Danielle Robinson (2004). Race in Motion: Reconstructing the Practice, Profession, and Politics of Social Dancing, New York City 1900-1930. University of California.
- Danielle Robinson (2009). "Performing American: Ragtime Dancing as Participatory Minstrelsy". Dance Chronicle. 32 (1): 89–126. doi:10.1080/01472520802690317. JSTOR 25598192.
- Robinson, Danielle (2010). "The Ugly Duckling: The Refinement of Ragtime Dancing and the Mass Production and Marketing of Modern Social Dance". Dance Research. 28 (2): 179–199. doi:10.3366/drs.2010.0103. JSTOR 40983025.
- Rogin, Michael (1996). Blackface, White Noise: Jewish Immigrants in the Hollywood Melting Pot. Berkeley: University of California Press.
- Seguin, Éliane (2017). Danses jazz: Une poétique de la relation [Jazz Dances: A Poetics of Relation] (in French). Pantin: Centre National de la Danse.
- Stearns, Marshall; Stearns, Jean (1994). Jazz Dances: The Story of American Vernacular Dances. New York: Da Capo Press.
- Tomko, Linda J. (1999). Dancing Class: Gender, Ethnicity, and Social Divides in American Dance, 1890–1920. Bloomfield: Indiana University Press.
