= Bunny hug =

Dancing style

The bunny hug was a dancing style performed by young people, in the early 20th century. It is thought to have originated in San Francisco, California in the Barbary Coast dance halls along with the Texas Tommy, turkey trot, and grizzly bear.

The bunny hug was performed to the music of America's great ragtime composers. The bunny hug, like other "animal" dances, caused a lot of uproar in polite society.

A song under the title "The Bunny Hug" with subtitle "the Craze of the Day", composed by Harry Von Tilzer with lyrics by William Jerome, was released in 1912.

The 1913 Vitagraph comedy short Bunny Dips Into Society features scenes of comedian John Bunny performing the Bunny Hug; the film was also released under the title Bunny and the Bunny Hug.

== See also ==
- Bunny hop
