= Texas Tommy (dance move) =

Texas Tommy (a.k.a. Apache) is the name used in Lindy Hop for a dance move.

== Description ==
The leader executes a standard swingout, but, on the four counts of the return, places the follower's right hand behind the follower's back at waist level and puts that hand into their own right hand, a position similar to shaking hands behind the follower's back. The follower then turns in the opposite direction while unrolling the arm, and the couple end up facing each other.

This dance move is used in a number of dances, such as West Coast Swing and Salsa, however the step pattern may vary from dance to dance. The name Texas Tommy was derived from the dance with the same name, which, around 1910, was the first social dance to feature a breakaway step, from which the swingout developed.
