= Texas Tommy (dance) =

Type of partnered dance

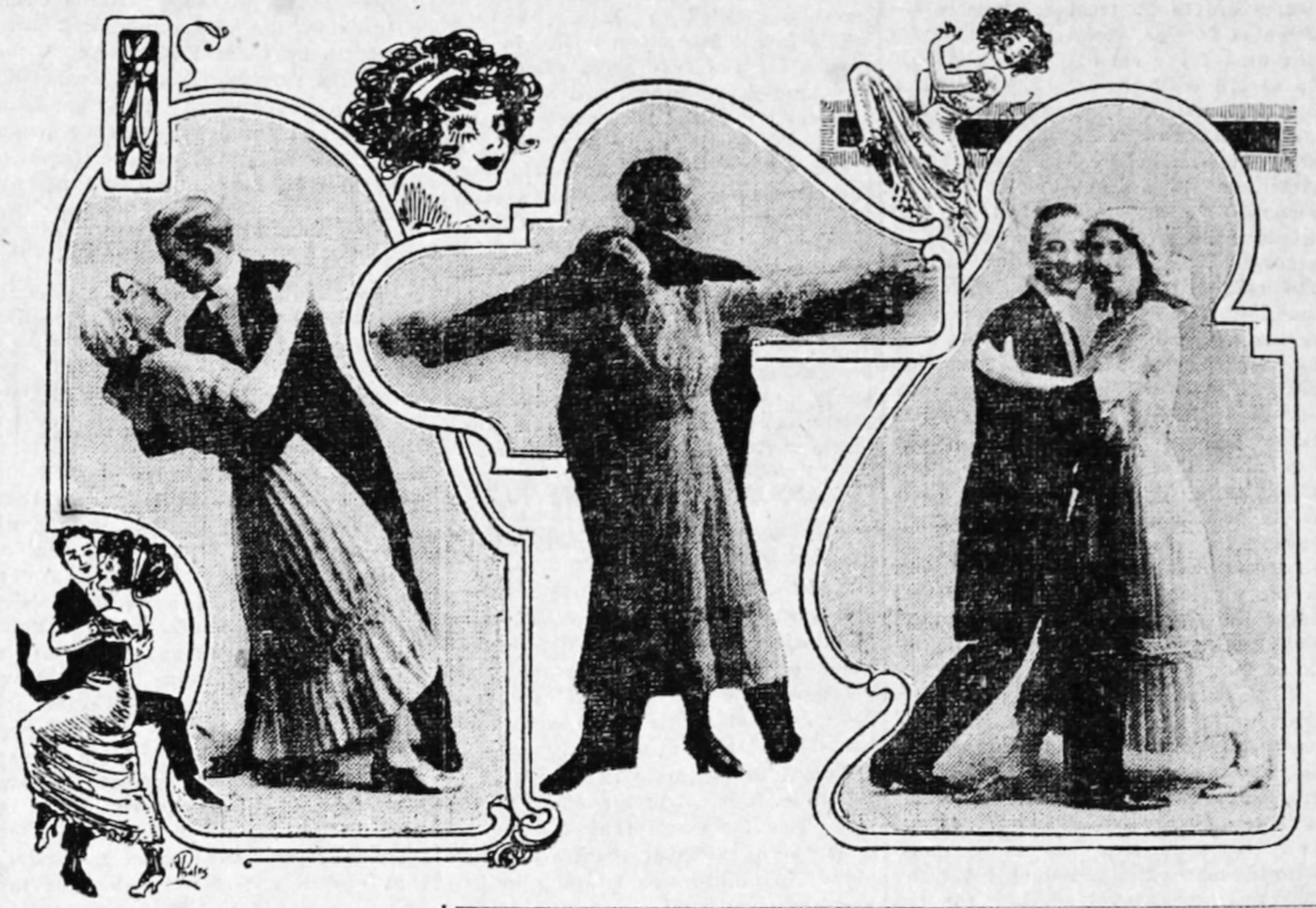
Texas Tommy dancers in 1912

The Texas Tommy is a vigorous social dance for couples that originated in San Francisco in the early twentieth century.

== History ==
After the great 1906 San Francisco earthquake and fire, the Barbary Coast, the red-light district of the city, was rebuilt and given new life as a tourist attraction, a place of dance halls, theatres, shops, and restaurants. Dance exhibitions and variety shows designed to attract tourists replaced prostitution as the chief business of the area. Many of the dance crazes that swept America during the 1900s and 1910s originated in this section of San Francisco. The Thalia, the largest and most popular dance hall on the Pacific coast, was the birthplace of the Texas Tommy. ("Tommy" was a slang term for prostitute.)

Around 1910, the Texas Tommy was a hit at a lowlife hot spot called Purcell's, a Negro cabaret, but it became respectable when it was danced at the upscale Fairmont Hotel, the most popular venue for ballroom dancing in San Francisco. Who invented the Texas Tommy is obscure. Most likely the signature moves of the dance were being performed by patrons at Purcell's, and some innovative visitor adapted them for the ballroom floor. Some historians say that Johnny Peters, an African American, developed the Texas Tommy some time before 1910. In any event, after sheet music for "The Texas Tommy Swing" was published on 1 February 1911, the Fairmont's house band frequently played the song for its patrons. It was not long before the Texas Tommy was danced on Broadway, in Ziegfeld Follies of 1911, performed by Vera Maxwell, Harry Watson Jr., and the ensemble. In 1911, two of the Texas Tommy dancers, Ethel Williams and Johnny Peters, brought the Texas Tommy from San Francisco to Harlem, where it became popular as a vaudeville act and eventually evolved into Early Lindy Hop through social dancing at the Savoy Ballroom. It was also included as a number in Darktown Follies, an all-black musical produced Off-Broadway in 1913. Peters and Ethel Williams, who were masters of the dance, executed it on stage, as they had done regularly at the Fairmont.

== Description ==
Some social dance historians have argued that the Texas Tommy was the first swing dance, on the basis that it was the first 8-count social dance to include a breakaway step from the closed position of most couple dances. Ethel Williams, who helped to popularize the dance in New York in 1913, described it as a "kick and a hop three times on each foot followed by a slide." The basic steps are followed by a breakaway, an open position that allowed for acrobatics, antics, improvisations, and showing off. Working from an old film of the dance, she also described it as having a basic pattern of "a loose step, hop-kick, step, hop-kick, run, run, run, run" and identified a "useful variation" of four step-kicks that "agrees with the open and improvisational manner that the Texas Tommy was described to have in many of the written references."

One reviewer of the Texas Tommy number in Ziegfeld Follies of 1911 described the dance in these words: "The Texas Tommy dancers are perhaps more acrobatic than eccentric . . . the whirl which spins his partner towards the footlights with such momentum that without aid she must assuredly fly across them must be nicely adjusted so that in neither force nor direction shall she escape the restraining grasp of his hand outstretched just at the right moment to arrest her." A more modern writer put it in simpler terms, saying that it was "a whirling couple dance with a momentum that nearly catapulted the female partner across the orchestra pit." Texas Tommy was later used to name a typical swingout dance move that was a characteristic of the Lindy Hop in the 1930s.

== Original sheet music ==
The "Texas Tommy Swing" was composed by Sid Brown, with lyrics by Val Harris, and was published by the World's Fair Publishing Company in San Francisco in January or February 1911. The sheet music cover was designed in the form of the front page of a newspaper, with the headline reading "The Dance That Makes the Whole World Stare." The faux newspaper included reprints of three articles from the San Francisco Examiner, headlined "Pavlowa Endorsed Texas Tommy Swing," "Mrs. Oelriches Liked Texas Tommy Swing," and "The Story of the Dance," which is transcribed here:

A breath from the cotton fields - the grizzly bear, the loving hug, the walk-back and the turkey-trot all blend in Texas Tommy Swing.

The Texas Tommy Swing invades the north and east like a dainty zephyr from the perfumed cotton fields of the sunny South. The rhythm of the Grizzy Bear, the inspiration of the Loving Hug, the grace of the Walk-Back and the abandon of the Turkey-Trot all belend in the harmony of the Texas Tommy Swing, which was really the parent of all the others.

The dance originated more than forty years ago among the negroes of the old Southern plantations. Every little movement has a meaning all its own to the heart truly in tune with nature. The graceful harmonies of the song and dance reflect the joyous spirit of the negro race, the care-free actions of the Dinahs and the Sams who gathered outside the cabin doors on moonlit nights and to the twang of the banjo or the scrape of the fiddle, vented the rhapsodies of mind and body in a purely natural way.

Here and there a raucous discord like the squaking voice of a chicken in distress breaks in upon the frivolous melody of the theme or a plaintive note brings a reminder of the tear always so close to the laugh in the negro nature.

Southern darkies brought the dance and a suggestion of the melody to San Francisco several years ago, and there upon the Barbary Coast it was rounded into perfect harmony. It took the place by storm. Eastern people interested in dancing took it up. Stage favorites seized upon its absorbing rhapsodies.

Society men and women accepted and adopted it. Pavlowa, the Czar's favorite dancer, went into raptures over it and incorporated it in her repertoire. Leaders of the four hundred all over the country regard it as one of the sights of San Francisco and endorse it to their friends on their return.

In tangible and concrete form this inspiring, historic and dramatic song and dance is now presented to the public for the first time, in Texas Tommy Swing.
