= Turkey trot (dance) =

Early 20th-century dance step

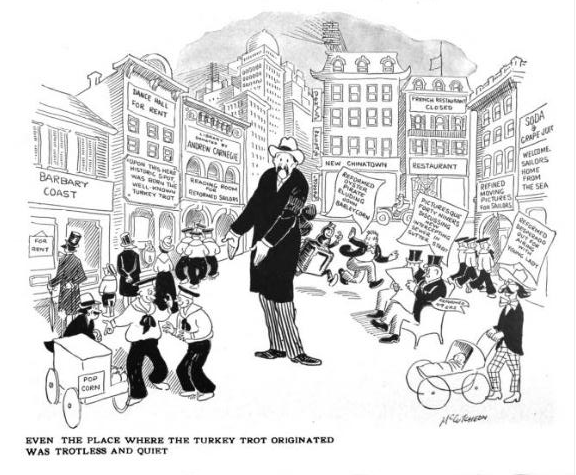
"Even the Place Where the Turkey Trot Originated was Trotless and Quiet."—1914 cartoon by John T. McCutcheon showing no dancing even at the Barbary Coast, San Francisco, a demonstration of the dance's dramatic decline in popularity.

The turkey trot was a dance made popular in the early 1900s. The Turkey Trot was done to fast ragtime music popular in the decade from 1900 to 1910 such as Scott Joplin's Maple Leaf Rag. Driven largely by youth counterculture of the time, the turkey trot fad quickly fell out of favor as the foxtrot, a much more conservative dance step based on the waltz, rose to popularity in 1914.

The basic step consisted of four hopping steps sideways with the feet well apart, first on one leg, then the other with a characteristic rise on the ball of the foot, followed by a drop upon the heel. The dance was embellished with scissor-like flicks of the feet and fast trotting actions with abrupt stops.

It has been said that dancers John Jarrott and Louise Gruenning introduced this dance as well as the Grizzly Bear at Ray Jones Café in Chicago, Illinois around 1909. Another theory states that it originated on the Barbary Coast, San Francisco, California. Joseph M. Daly wrote music for the dance in 1912. Irene and Vernon Castle raised its popularity by dancing the Turkey Trot in the Broadway show The Sunshine Girl.

It achieved popularity chiefly as a result of its being denounced by the Vatican. It was thought that the positions assumed by the dancers were offensively suggestive. Conservative members of society felt the dance promoted immorality and tried to get it banned at public functions, which only served to increase its popularity.

There were news reports of dancers being fined because "their Turkey Trots were interpreted by the courts as disorderly conduct." In another instance, fifteen working girls were fired from their jobs with the Philadelphia song publisher Curtis Publishing when they were caught doing the turkey trot, although it was during their lunch break.

== In popular culture ==
The song "Let's Turkey Trot" by "Little Eva" Boyd and the Cookies reached number 20 on the Billboard Hot 100 in February 1963, fifty years after the dance step's heyday.
